= Scottish Book =

Math problem notebook in Lwów (1930s–1941)

Coordinates: 49°50′09″N 24°1′57″E

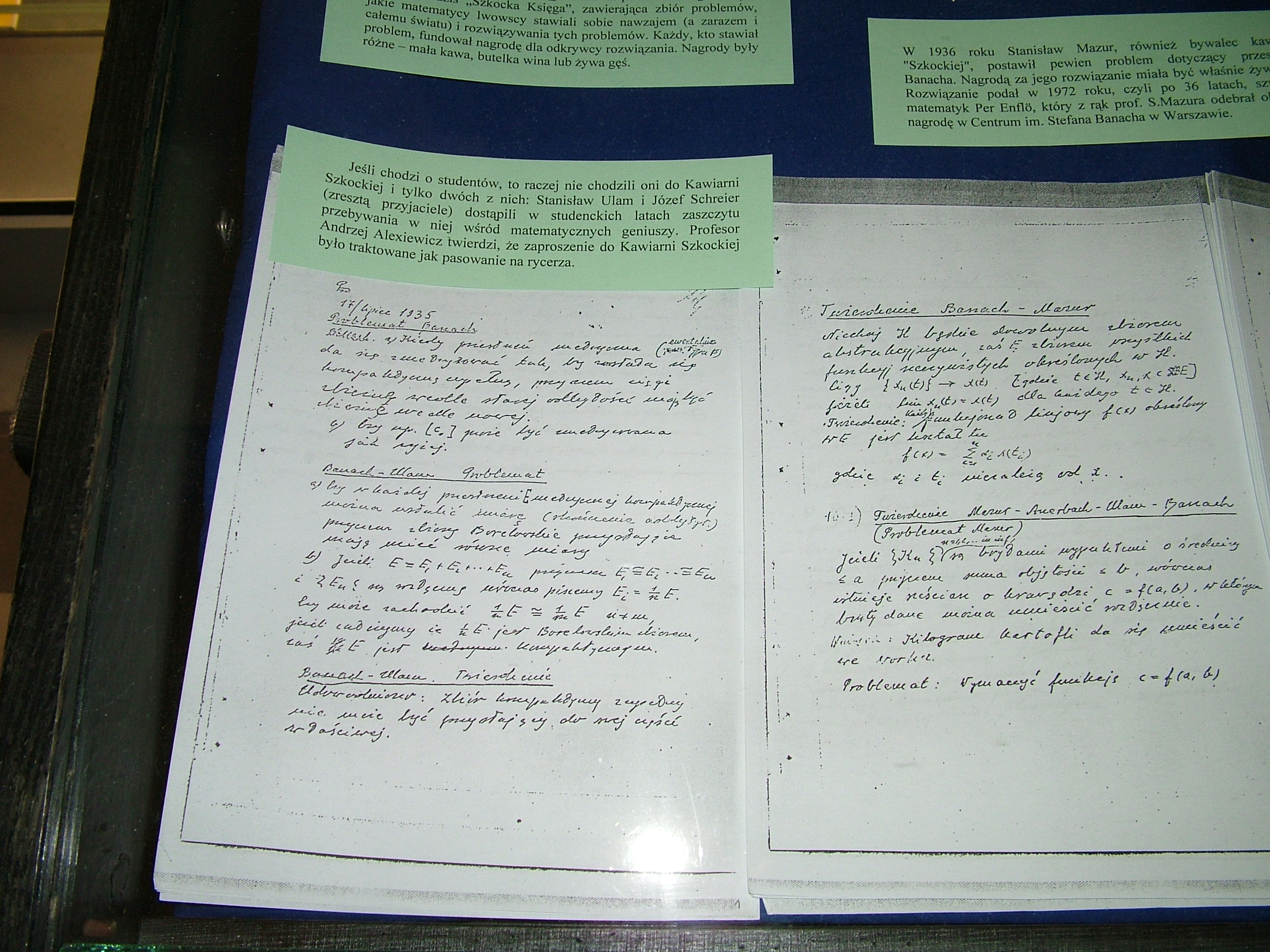
Part of the Scottish Book with notes of Stefan Banach and Stanislaw Ulam.

The Scottish Book (Polish: Księga Szkocka) was a thick notebook used by mathematicians of the Lwów School of Mathematics in Poland for jotting down unsolved problems. The notebook was named after the Scottish Café, where it was kept.

Originally, the mathematicians who gathered at the cafe would write down the problems and equations directly on the cafe's marble table tops, but these would be erased at the end of each day, and so the record of the preceding discussions would be lost. The idea for the book was most likely originally suggested by Stefan Banach's wife, Łucja Banach.

== History ==
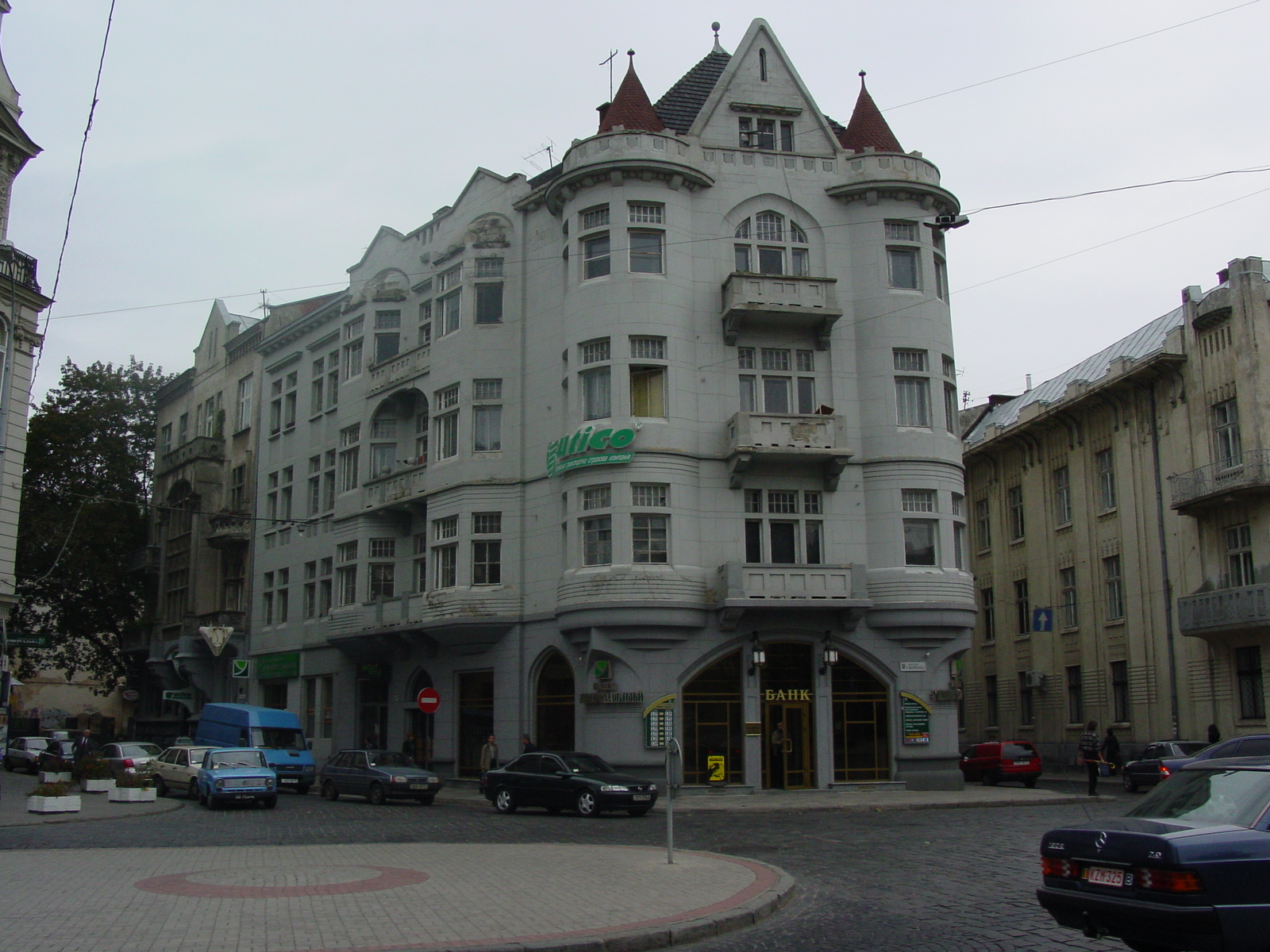
The building of the Scottish cafe where the book was recorded and stored

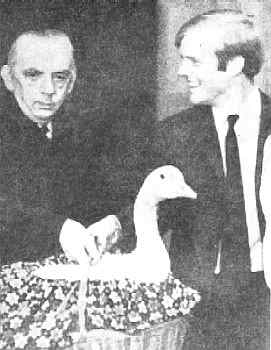
1972: Mazur (left) acknowledges Per Enflo with the promised "live goose", the prize for having solved problem 153.

The Scottish Café (Polish: Kawiarnia Szkocka) was the café in Lwów (now Lviv, Ukraine) where, in the 1930s and 1940s, mathematicians from the Lwów School of Mathematics collaboratively discussed research problems, particularly in functional analysis and topology.

Stanisław Ulam recounted that the tables of the café had marble tops, so they could write directly on the table in pencil during their discussions. To keep the results from being lost and after becoming annoyed with their writing directly on the table tops, Stefan Banach's wife Łucja provided the mathematicians with a large notebook, which was used for writing down the problems and answers and eventually became known as the Scottish Book. The book—a collection of solved, unsolved, and even probably unsolvable problems—could be borrowed by any of the guests of the café. Solving any of the problems was rewarded with prizes, with the most difficult and challenging problems having expensive prizes (during the Great Depression and on the eve of World War II), such as a bottle of fine brandy.

For problem 153, which was later recognized as being closely related to Stefan Banach's "basis problem", Stanisław Mazur offered the prize of a live goose. This problem was solved in 1972 by Per Enflo, who was presented with a live goose by Mazur in a ceremony that was broadcast throughout Poland.

The café building used to house the Universal Bank at the street address of 27 Taras Shevchenko Prospekt. The original cafe was renovated in May 2014 and contains a copy of the Scottish Book.

== Problems contributed by individual authors ==
A total of 193 problems were written down in the book. Stanisław Mazur contributed a total of 43 problems, 24 of them as a single author and 19 together with Stefan Banach. Banach himself wrote 14, plus another 11 with Stanisław Ulam and Mazur. Ulam wrote 40 problems and additional 15 ones with others.

During the Soviet occupation of Lwów, several Russian mathematicians visited the city and also added problems to the book.

Hugo Steinhaus contributed the last problem on 31 May 1941, shortly before the German attack on the Soviet Union. The problem involved the probability distribution of matches within a matchbox, a question motivated by Banach's habit of chain smoking cigarettes.

== Continuity ==
After World War II, an English translation annotated by Ulam was published by Los Alamos National Laboratory in 1957. After World War II, Hugo Steinhaus at the University of Wrocław revived the tradition of the Scottish book with The New Scottish Book from 1945 to 1958.

The tradition of the Scottish Book continues to inspire not only mathematicians but also educators in other fields. Piotr Kowzan proposed a "goose method" as a pedagogical tool for marking open problems and encouraging future research. Inspired by the eccentric rewards in the Scottish Book, this approach aims to foster curiosity and knowledge-building across generations.

== Associated people ==
The following mathematicians were associated with the Lwów School of Mathematics or contributed to The Scottish Book:

- P. Alexandroff (Pavel Alexandrov?)
- Herman Auerbach (murdered in Bełżec extermination camp)
- A.F. Fermant (ru:Бермант, Анисим Фёдорович, i.e. Anisim Fedorovich Bermant?)
- Bogolubov (Nikolay Bogolyubov?)
- Stefan Banach (forced to live as a lice feeder, died of cancer in 1945)
- Karol Borsuk (imprisoned for working in the Underground Warsaw University)
- Meier Eidelheit (murdered in the Holocaust in 1943)
- Samuel Eilenberg (fled Europe for Princeton University in 1939)
- Maurice René Fréchet
- Leopold Infeld (returned from Cambridge to Lwów in 1935 but left again for Princeton University in 1936 under the Nazi threat)
- Joseph Kampé de Fériet
- Marek Kac (went to study in the US in 1938; his family who stayed were murdered in Krzemieniec in 1942)
- Stefan Kaczmarz (died in unclear circumstances in 1939 after being called up for military service)
- Bronisław Knaster (lived as a lice feeder during the occupation of Lwów)
- Kazimierz Kuratowski (worked in the Underground Warsaw University)
- Antoni Łomnicki (murdered in the Massacre of Lviv professors)
- Lazar Lyusternik (participated in the persecution of his teacher in 1936)
- Józef Marcinkiewicz (believed killed in the Katyn massacre; his manuscripts, entrusted to his parents, were lost)
- Stanisław Mazur
- John von Neumann (moved to Princeton University in 1930)
- Władysław Nikliborc (pl, died 1948)
- Cyril Offord
- Władysław Orlicz
- Stanisław Ruziewicz (murdered in the Massacre of Lviv professors)
- Stanisław Saks (joined the Polish underground, executed in 1942 by Gestapo)
- Juliusz Schauder (had no paper to record his results after 1941, killed by Gestapo in 1943)
- Józef Schreier (took his life in the Drohobycz Ghetto in 1943 to avoid capture)
- Wacław Sierpiński (house burned by Nazis in 1944, worked in the Underground Warsaw University)
- Sergei Sobolev
- Hugo Steinhaus (spent World War II in hiding, teaching in illegal underground education)
- Ludwig Sternbach (taken to Bełżec extermination camp)
- Simion Stoilow
- Edward Szpilrajn (later changed his name to Edward Marczewski to escape Nazi persecution)
- Stanisław Ulam (left Poland for the US in 1939, worked on the Manhattan Project)
- Rolin Wavre
- Antoni Zygmund (emigrated to the US in 1940)
