= Meier Eidelheit =

Polish mathematician (1910–1943)

Eidelheit, Meier
- Born: 6 July 1910; Janów
- Died: March 1943 (aged 32)
- Education: Technical University of Lwów
- Known for: Eidelheit separation theorem (1936), Eidelheit interpolation theorem (1936), Eidelheit theorem concerning rings of continuous functions (1940)
- Scientific career
- Fields: Mathematics
- Workplaces: University of Lwów
- Doctoral advisors: Stefan Banach

Meier "Maks" Eidelheit (6 July 1910 – March 1943) was a Polish mathematician belonging to the Lwów School of Mathematics who worked in Lwów and was murdered in the Holocaust.

== Biography ==
Meier Eidelheit left the Lwów Gymnasium in 1929 and then studied mathematics at the scientific faculty in Lwów, completing his study in 1933 with a thesis on the theory of summation. In 1938, with Stefan Banach as supervisor, he gained a doctorate from the Jan-Kazimierz-University of Lwów with a Dissertation über die Auflösbarkeit eines linearen Gleichungssystems mit unendlich vielen Unbekannten. From 1933 to 1939 he gave private lectures; from 31 January 1939 onwards he was an Assistant Professor of Analysis, from 21 March 1941 he was candidate for a professorship. He worked mainly on Functional analysis. On the basis of his 1936 paper on convex sets in linear normed spaces, geometric versions of the hyperplane separation theorem are also known (in German) as Trennungssatz von Eidelheit (Eidelheit separation theorem). A theorem on the solubility of certain infinite systems of equations in Fréchet spaces is also named after him.

Eidelheit published six papers in Studia Mathematica from 1936 to 1940; a seventh was printed posthumously. Eidelheit was an active contributor to the Scottish Book, posing problems 172, 173, 174, 176 and 188 and answering problem 26 (Mazur), 64 (Mazur), 162 (Steinhaus), and 176 (Eidelheit).

Meier Eidelheit was murdered in the Holocaust in March 1943. His posthumously published article Quelques remarques sur les fonctionelles linéaires in volume 10 of the Studia Mathematica was prefaced with the following lines: "L’auteur de ce travail a été assassiné par les Allemands en mars de 1943. Le manuscrit qu’il fut parvenir à la Rédaction en 1941 a été retrouvé récemment entre les papiers laissés par S. Banach." (in English: The author of this work was murdered in March 1943 by the Germans. The manuscript, which reached the editors in 1941, was recently found among the writings left by S. Banach.)

== See also ==
- Hyperplane separation theorem
- List of Poles § Mathematics
- Scottish Book
