= Enrico Bombieri =

Italian mathematician (born 1940)

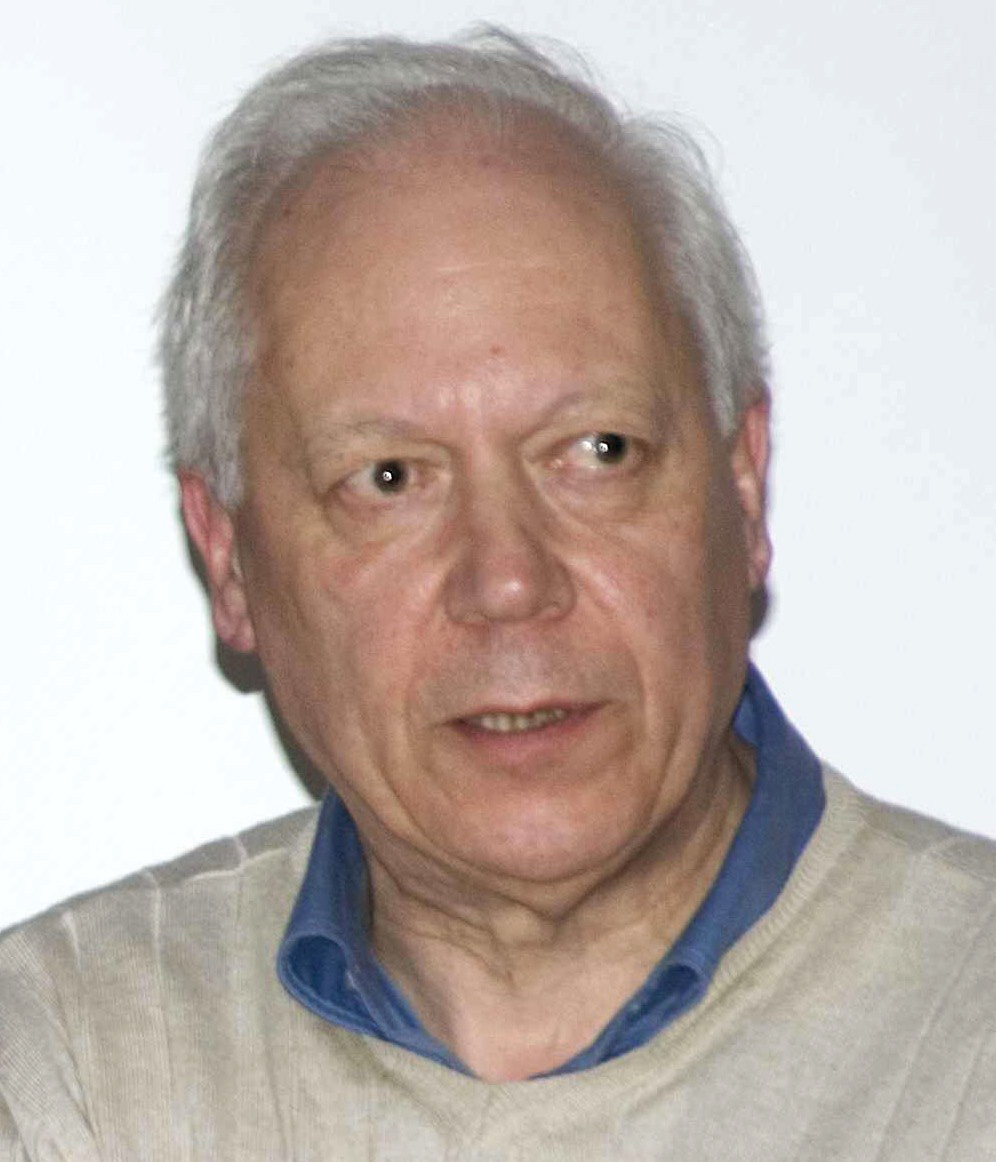
- Born: 26 November 1940 (age 85); Milan, Italy
- Education: University of Milan; Trinity College, Cambridge
- Known for: Determinant method Large sieve method in analytic number theory Bombieri-Lang conjecture Bombieri norm Bombieri–Vinogradov theorem "Heights" in Diophantine geometry Siegel's lemma for bases (Bombieri–Vaaler); Partial differential equations
- Awards: 1966, Caccioppoli Prize; 1974, Fields Medal; 1976, Feltrinelli Prize; 1980, Balzan Prize; 2006, Pythagoras Prize; 2008, Joseph L. Doob Prize; 2010, King Faisal International Prize; 2020, Crafoord Prize
- Scientific career
- Fields: Mathematics
- Workplaces: Institute for Advanced Study
- Doctoral advisor: Giovanni Ricci
- Doctoral students: Umberto Zannier

Enrico Bombieri (born 26 November 1940) is an Italian mathematician, known for his work in analytic number theory, Diophantine geometry, complex analysis, and group theory. Bombieri is currently professor emeritus in the School of Mathematics at the Institute for Advanced Study in Princeton, New Jersey. Bombieri won the Fields Medal in 1974 for his work on the large sieve and its application to the distribution of prime numbers.

== Career ==
Bombieri published his first mathematical paper in 1957, when he was 16 years old. In 1963, at age 22, he earned his first degree (Laurea) in mathematics from the Università degli Studi di Milano under the supervision of Giovanni Ricci and then studied at Trinity College, Cambridge, with Harold Davenport.

Bombieri was an assistant professor (1963–1965) and then a full professor (1965–1966) at the Università di Cagliari, at the Università di Pisa in 1966–1974, and then at the Scuola Normale Superiore di Pisa in 1974–1977. From Pisa, he emigrated in 1977 to the United States, where he became a professor at the School of Mathematics at the Institute for Advanced Study in Princeton, New Jersey. In 2011, he became professor emeritus.

Bombieri is also known for his pro bono service on behalf of the mathematics profession, e.g. for serving on external review boards and for peer-reviewing extraordinarily complicated manuscripts (like the paper of Per Enflo on the invariant subspace problem).

== Research ==
The Bombieri–Vinogradov theorem is one of the major applications of the large sieve method. It improves Dirichlet's theorem on prime numbers in arithmetic progressions, by showing that by averaging over the modulus over a range, the mean error is much less than can be proved in a given case. This result can sometimes substitute for the still-unproved generalized Riemann hypothesis.

In 1969, Bombieri, De Giorgi, and Giusti solved Bernstein's problem on minimal surfaces in dimensions above eight.

In 1976, Bombieri developed the technique known as the "asymptotic sieve". In 1980, he supplied the completion of the proof of the uniqueness of finite groups of Ree type in characteristic 3; at the time of its publication, it was one of the missing steps in the classification of finite simple groups.

== Awards ==
Bombieri's research in number theory, algebraic geometry, and mathematical analysis has earned him many international prizes — a Fields Medal in 1974 and the Balzan Prize in 1980. He was a plenary speaker at the International Congress of Mathematicians, which took place in 1974 in Vancouver. He is a member, or foreign member, of several learned academies, including the Accademia Nazionale dei Lincei (elected 1976), the French Academy of Sciences (elected 1984), the Academia Europaea (elected 1995), and the United States National Academy of Sciences (elected 1996). In 2002 he was made Cavaliere di Gran Croce al Merito della Repubblica Italiana. In 2010, he received the King Faisal International Prize (jointly with Terence Tao). and in 2020 he was awarded the Crafoord Prize in Mathematics.

== Other interests ==
Bombieri, accomplished also in the arts, explored for wild orchids and other plants as a hobby in the Alps when a young man.

With his powder-blue shirt open at the neck, khaki pants and running shoes, he might pass for an Italian film director at Cannes. Married with a grown daughter, he is a gourmet cook and a serious painter: He carries his paints and brushes with him whenever he travels. Still, mathematics never seems far from his mind. In a recent painting, Bombieri, a one-time member of the Cambridge University chess team, depicts a giant chessboard by a lake. He's placed the pieces to reflect a critical point in the historic match in which IBM's chess-playing computers, Deep Blue, beat Garry Kasparov.

== Selected publications ==
=== Sole ===
- E. Bombieri, Le Grand Crible dans la Théorie Analytique des Nombres (Seconde Édition). Astérisque 18, Paris 1987.

=== Joint ===
- Bombieri, E.; Vaaler, J. (February 1983). "On Siegel's lemma". Inventiones Mathematicae. 73 (1): 11–32. Bibcode:1983InMat..73...11B. doi:10.1007/BF01393823. S2CID 121274024.
- Bombieri, E.; Mueller, J. (1983). "On effective measures of irrationality for ${\scriptscriptstyle\sqrt[r]{a/b}}$ and related numbers". Journal für die reine und angewandte Mathematik. 342: 173–196.
- B. Beauzamy, E. Bombieri, P. Enflo and H. L. Montgomery. "Product of polynomials in many variables", Journal of Number Theory, pages 219–245, 1990.

== See also ==
- Bombieri norm
- Bombieri–Vinogradov theorem
- Glossary of arithmetic and Diophantine geometry – Bombieri–Lang conjecture

== Sources ==
- Bombieri, E.; Mueller, J. (1983). "On effective measures of irrationality for ${\scriptscriptstyle\sqrt[r]{a/b}}$ and related numbers". Journal für die Reine und Angewandte Mathematik. 342: 173–196.
- Bombieri, E.; Vaaler, J. (February 1983). "On Siegel's lemma". Inventiones Mathematicae. 73 (1): 11–32. Bibcode:1983InMat..73...11B. doi:10.1007/BF01393823. S2CID 121274024.
- E. Bombieri, Le Grand Crible dans la Théorie Analytique des Nombres (Seconde Édition). Astérisque 18, Paris 1987.
- B. Beauzamy, E. Bombieri, P. Enflo and H. L. Montgomery. "Product of polynomials in many variables", Journal of Number Theory, pages 219–245, 1990.
- Enrico Bombieri and Walter Gubler (2006). Heights in Diophantine Geometry. Cambridge U. P.
- "Enrico Bombieri Italian mathematician". www.britannica.com (Encyclopedia Britannica).
