= Scottish Café =

Café in Lwów / Lviv

Coordinates: 49°50′09″N 24°1′57″E

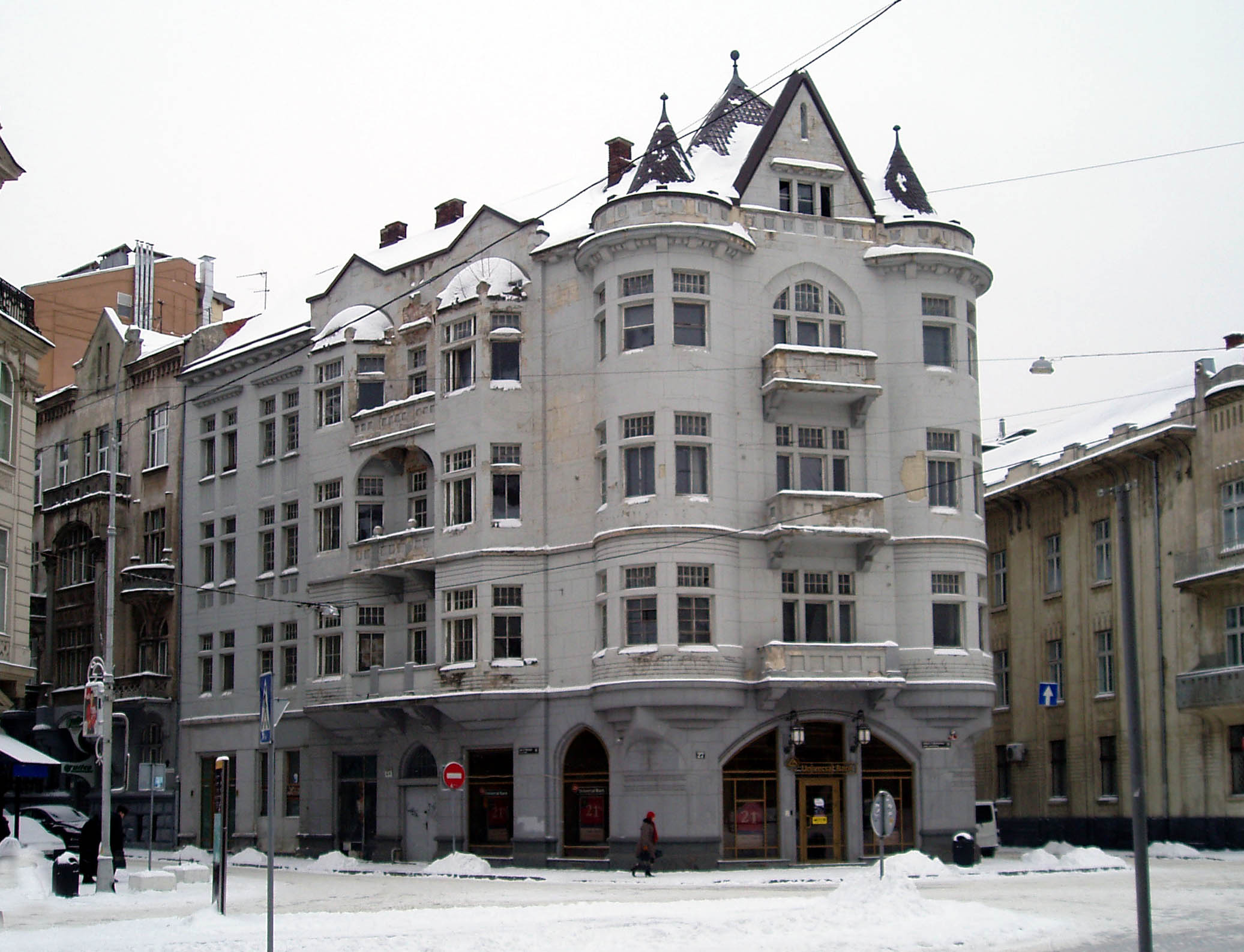
The Scottish Café's building now houses the Szkocka Restaurant & Bar (named for the original Scottish Café) and the Atlas Deluxe hotel.

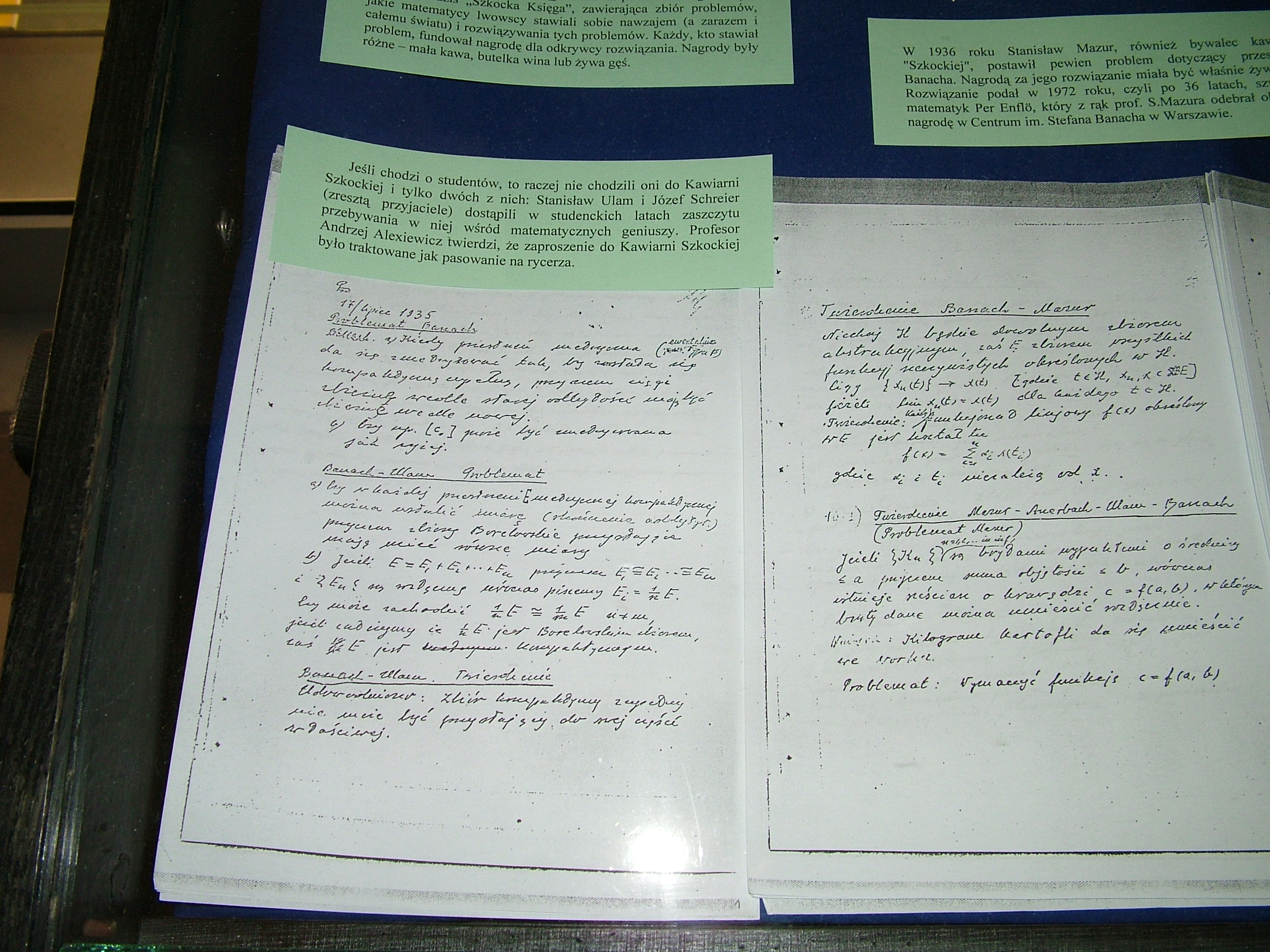
Part of the Scottish Book with Banach's and Ulam's notes.

The Scottish Café (Polish: Kawiarnia Szkocka) was a café in Lwów, Poland (now Lviv, Ukraine) where, in the 1930s and 1940s, mathematicians from the Lwów School of Mathematics collaboratively discussed research problems, particularly in functional analysis and topology.

== History ==
The café was located at Plac Akademicki 9, near the Jan Kazimierz University, and belonged to Zofia Teliczkowska. It offered traditional Polish dishes, coffee and alcoholic beverages. The Scottish Café's name originated from the building's supposed similarity to a Scottish castle. It became popular among the Lwów mathematicians who regularly met there to eat and drink, play chess, debate and solve mathematical problems. Other intellectuals who are known to have frequented the place include Bruno Schulz, Franz Kafka, Stanisław Lem, Simon Wiesenthal, and Raphael Lemkin.

The place was known for its unique and lively atmosphere, the focal point of activity being the table of Stefan Banach, Stanisław Mazur, and Stanisław Ulam. An invitation to the Scottish Café was regarded as a kind of rite of passage reserved only for the most talented students who had earned the respect of one of the faculty members.

Stanisław Ulam recounts that the tables of the café had marble tops, so they could write in pencil, directly on the table, during their discussions. To keep the results from being lost, and after becoming annoyed with their writing directly on the table tops, Stefan Banach's wife, Łucja, provided the mathematicians with a large notebook, which was used for writing the problems and answers and eventually became known as the Scottish Book. The book—a collection of solved, unsolved, and even probably unsolvable problems—could be borrowed by any of the guests of the café. Solving any of the problems was rewarded with prizes, with the most difficult and challenging problems having expensive prizes (during the Great Depression and on the eve of World War II), such as a bottle of fine brandy.

For problem 153, which was later recognized as being closely related to Stefan Banach's "basis problem", Stanisław Mazur offered the prize of a live goose in 1936. This problem was solved only in 1972 by Per Enflo, who was presented with the live goose in a ceremony that was broadcast throughout Poland.

In 2002, a volume of poems titled The Scottish Cafe was published in New York (Polish edition: Kawiarnia Szkocka, 2010). It was written by Susana H. Case, the book was inspired by the meetings of the group of mathematicians who gathered in the café in the years leading up to the outbreak of the Second World War.

The café building now houses the Szkocka Restaurant & Bar (named after the original Scottish Café) and the Atlas Deluxe hotel at the street address of 27 Taras Shevchenko Prospekt.

== Participants ==
The following mathematicians were associated with the Lwów School of Mathematics or contributed to The Scottish Book:

- Stefan Banach
- Karol Borsuk
- Mark Kac
- Stefan Kaczmarz
- Bronisław Knaster
- Kazimierz Kuratowski
- Stanisław Saks
- Juliusz Schauder
- Hugo Steinhaus
- Stanisław Ulam
