= Maurey =

Maurey is a surname. Notable people with the surname include:

- Bernard Maurey (born 1948), French mathematician
- Hervé Maurey (born 1961), French politician
- Max Maurey (1866–1947), French playwright
- Nicole Maurey (1925–2016), French actress
- Risa Lavizzo-Mourey (born 1954), American medical doctor and executive
