= Per Enflo =

Swedish mathematician and concert pianist

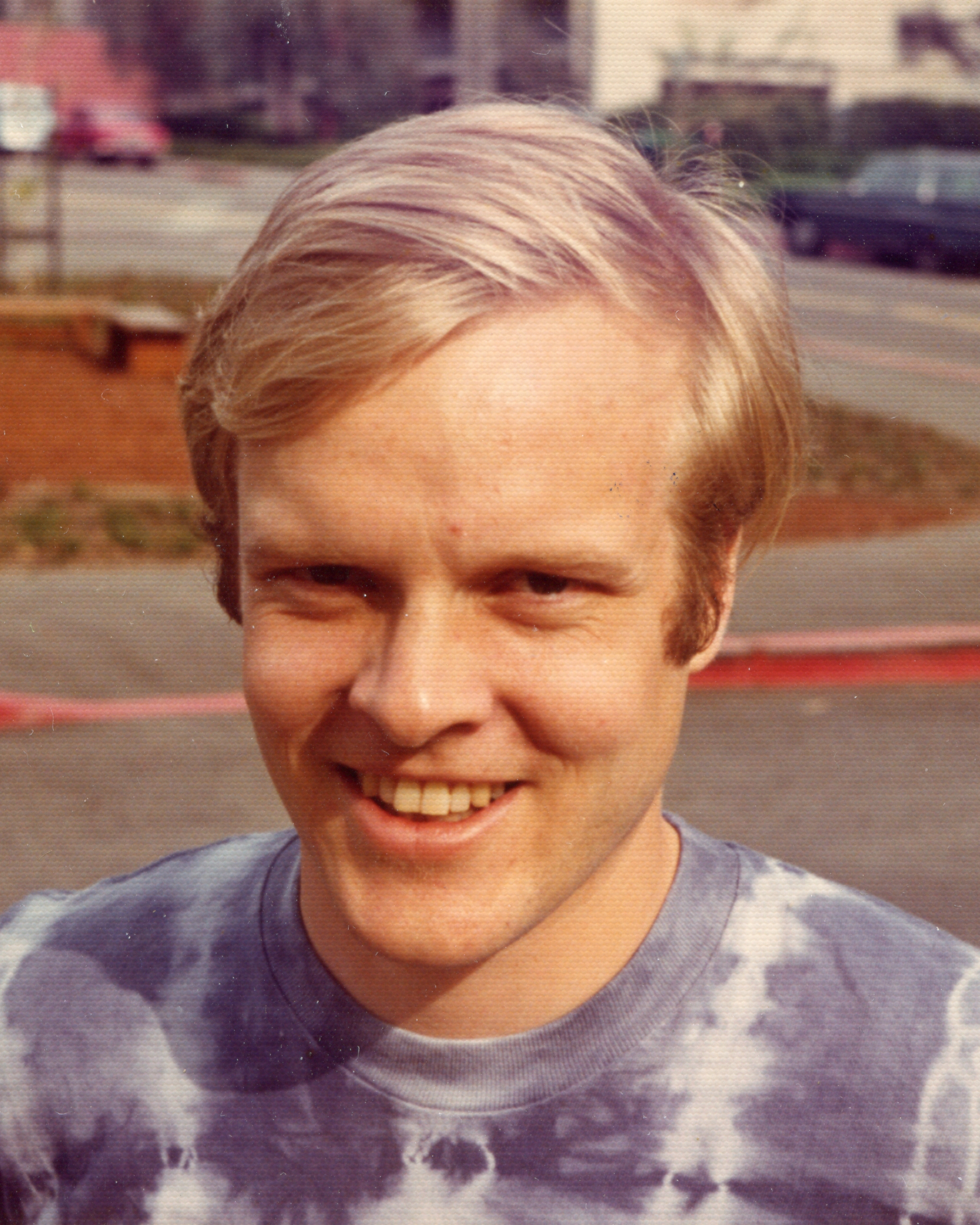
- Enflo in 1972
- Born: 20 May 1944 (age 82); Stockholm, Sweden
- Education: Stockholm University
- Known for: Approximation problem Schauder basis Hilbert's fifth problem (infinite-dimensional) uniformly convex renorms of super-reflexive Banach spaces embedding metric spaces (unbounded distortion of cube) "Concentration" of polynomials at low degree Invariant subspace problem
- Awards: Mazur's live goose for solving "Scottish Book" Problem 153
- Scientific career
- Fields: Functional analysis Operator theory Analytic number theory
- Workplaces: University of California, Berkeley; Stanford University; École Polytechnique, Paris; The Royal Institute of Technology, Stockholm; Kent State University
- Doctoral advisor: Hans Rådström
- Doctoral students: Angela Spalsbury; Bruce Reznick

Per H. Enflo (Swedish: [ˈpæːr ˈěːnfluː]; 20 May 1944 – 28 Sept. 2026) was a Swedish mathematician working primarily in functional analysis, a field in which he solved problems that had been considered fundamental. Three of these problems had been open for more than forty years:

- The basis problem and the approximation problem and later
- the invariant subspace problem for Banach spaces.

In solving these problems, Enflo developed new techniques which were then used by other researchers in functional analysis and operator theory for years. Some of Enflo's research has been important also in other mathematical fields, such as number theory, and in computer science, especially computer algebra and approximation algorithms.

Enflo worked at Kent State University, where he held the title of University Professor. He had earlier held positions at the Miller Institute for Basic Research in Science at the University of California, Berkeley, Stanford University, École Polytechnique, (Paris) and The Royal Institute of Technology, Stockholm.

Enflo was also a concert pianist.

== Enflo's contributions to functional analysis and operator theory ==
In mathematics, functional analysis is concerned with the study of vector spaces and operators acting upon them. It has its historical roots in the study of functional spaces, in particular transformations of functions, such as the Fourier transform, as well as in the study of differential and integral equations. In functional analysis, an important class of vector spaces consists of the complete normed vector spaces over the real or complex numbers, which are called Banach spaces. An important example of a Banach space is a Hilbert space, where the norm arises from an inner product. Hilbert spaces are of fundamental importance in many areas, including the mathematical formulation of quantum mechanics, stochastic processes, and time-series analysis. Besides studying spaces of functions, functional analysis also studies the continuous linear operators on spaces of functions.

=== Hilbert's fifth problem and embeddings ===
At Stockholm University, Hans Rådström suggested that Enflo consider Hilbert's fifth problem in the spirit of functional analysis. In two years, 1969–1970, Enflo published five papers on Hilbert's fifth problem; these papers are collected in Enflo (1970), along with a short summary. Some of the results of these papers are described in Enflo (1976) and in the last chapter of Benyamini and Lindenstrauss.

==== Applications in computer science ====
Enflo's techniques have found application in computer science. Algorithm theorists derive approximation algorithms that embed finite metric spaces into low-dimensional Euclidean spaces with low "distortion" (in Gromov's terminology for the Lipschitz category; cf. Banach–Mazur distance). Low-dimensional problems have lower computational complexity, of course. More importantly, if the problems embed well in either the Euclidean plane or the three-dimensional Euclidean space, then geometric algorithms become exceptionally fast.

However, such embedding techniques have limitations, as shown by Enflo's (1969) theorem:

For every $m\geq 2$, the Hamming cube $C_m$ cannot be embedded with "distortion $D$" (or less) into $2^m$-dimensional Euclidean space if $D < \sqrt{ m }$. Consequently, the optimal embedding is the natural embedding, which realizes $\{0,1\}^m$ as a subspace of $m$-dimensional Euclidean space.

This theorem, "found by Enflo [1969], is probably the first result showing an unbounded distortion for embeddings into Euclidean spaces. Enflo considered the problem of uniform embeddability among Banach spaces, and the distortion was an auxiliary device in his proof."

=== Geometry of Banach spaces ===
A uniformly convex space is a Banach space so that, for every $\epsilon>0$ there is some $\delta>0$ so that for any two vectors with $\|x\|\le1$ and $\|y\|\le 1,$

$$\|x+y\|>2-\delta$$

implies that

$$\|x-y\|<\epsilon.$$

Intuitively, the center of a line segment inside the unit ball must lie deep inside the unit ball unless the segment is short.

In 1972 Enflo proved that "every super-reflexive Banach space admits an equivalent uniformly convex norm".

=== The basis problem and Mazur's goose ===
With one paper, which was published in 1973, Per Enflo solved three problems that had stumped functional analysts for decades: The basis problem of Stefan Banach, the "Goose problem" of Stanisław Mazur, and the approximation problem of Alexander Grothendieck. Grothendieck had shown that his approximation problem was the central problem in the theory of Banach spaces and continuous linear operators.

==== Basis problem of Banach ====
The basis problem was posed by Stefan Banach in his book, Theory of Linear Operators. Banach asked whether every separable Banach space has a Schauder basis.

A Schauder basis or countable basis is similar to the usual (Hamel) basis of a vector space; the difference is that for Hamel bases we use linear combinations that are finite sums, while for Schauder bases they may be infinite sums. This makes Schauder bases more suitable for the analysis of infinite-dimensional topological vector spaces including Banach spaces.

Schauder bases were described by Juliusz Schauder in 1927. Let V denote a Banach space over the field F. A Schauder basis is a sequence (b_{n}) of elements of V such that for every element v ∈ V there exists a unique sequence (α_{n}) of elements in F so that

$$v = \sum_{n \in \N} \alpha_n b_n \,$$

where the convergence is understood with respect to the norm topology. Schauder bases can also be defined analogously in a general topological vector space.

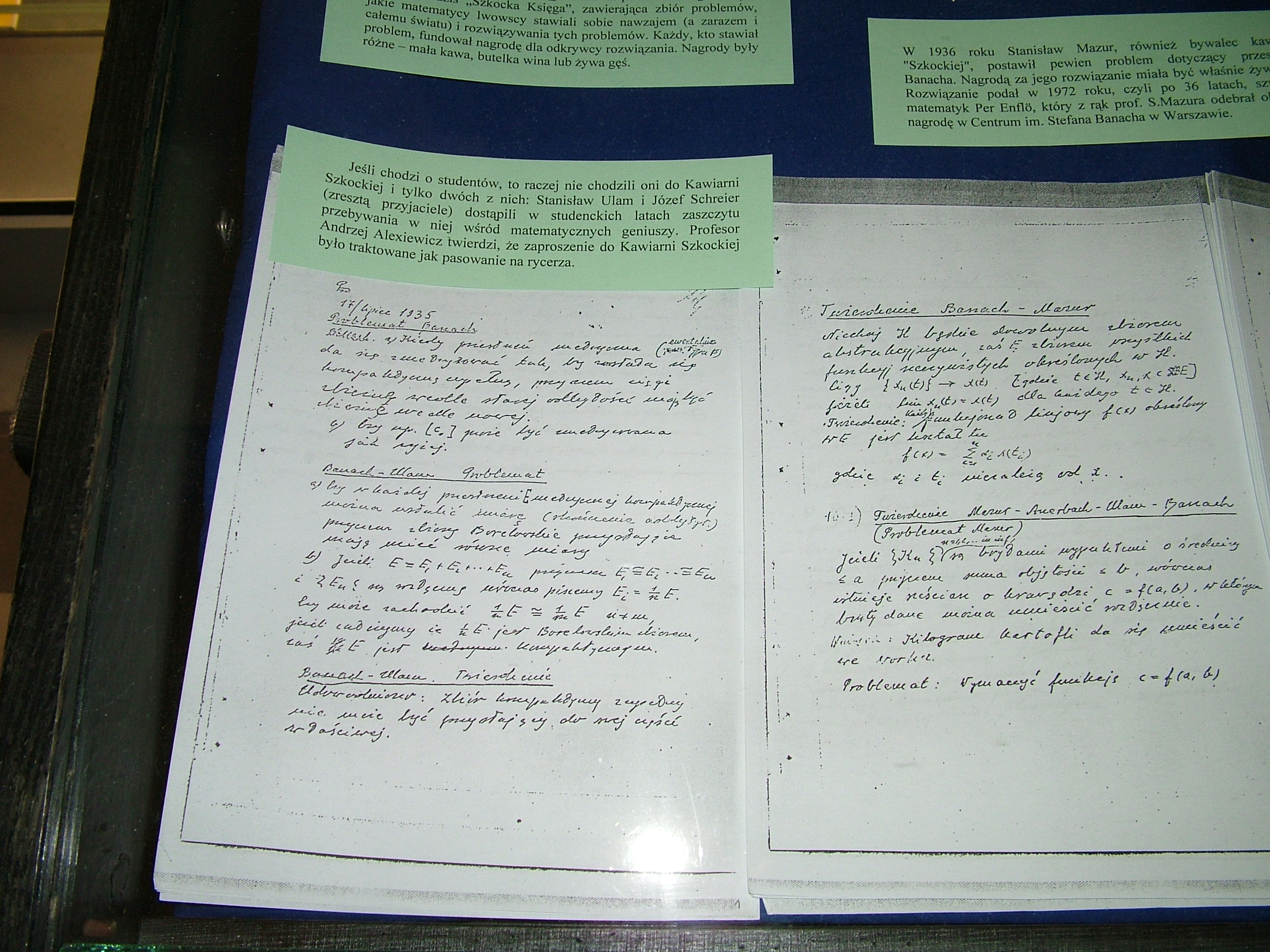
In 1937, Polish mathematician Stanisław Mazur promised a "live goose" as the prize for solving problem 153 in the Scottish Book. In 1972, Mazur presented the goose to Per Enflo.

==== Problem 153 in the Scottish Book: Mazur's goose ====
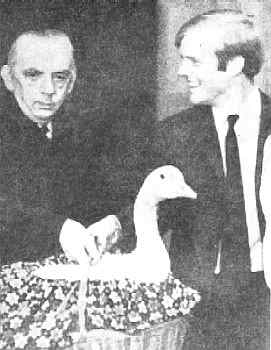
In 1972 Stanisław Mazur awarded Enflo the promised live goose for solving a problem in the Scottish book.

Banach and other Polish mathematicians would work on mathematical problems at the Scottish Café. When a problem was especially interesting and when its solution seemed difficult, the problem would be written down in the book of problems, which soon became known as the Scottish Book. For problems that seemed especially important or difficult or both, the problem's proposer would often pledge to award a prize for its solution.

On 6 November 1936, Stanisław Mazur posed a problem on representing continuous functions. Formally writing down problem 153 in the Scottish Book, Mazur promised as the reward a "live goose", an especially rich prize during the Great Depression and on the eve of World War II.

Fairly soon afterwards, it was realized that Mazur's problem was closely related to Banach's problem on the existence of Schauder bases in separable Banach spaces. Most of the other problems in the Scottish Book were solved regularly. However, there was little progress on Mazur's problem and a few other problems, which became famous open problems to mathematicians around the world.

==== Grothendieck's formulation of the approximation problem ====
Grothendieck's work on the theory of Banach spaces and continuous linear operators introduced the approximation property. A Banach space is said to have the approximation property, if every compact operator is a limit of finite-rank operators. The converse is always true.

In a long monograph, Grothendieck proved that if every Banach space had the approximation property, then every Banach space would have a Schauder basis. Grothendieck thus focused the attention of functional analysts on deciding whether every Banach space have the approximation property.

==== Enflo's solution ====
In 1972, Per Enflo constructed a separable Banach space that lacks the approximation property and a Schauder basis. In 1972, Mazur awarded a live goose to Enflo in a ceremony at the Stefan Banach Center in Warsaw; the "goose reward" ceremony was broadcast throughout Poland.

=== Invariant subspace problem and polynomials ===
In functional analysis, one of the most prominent problems was the invariant subspace problem, which required the evaluation of the truth of the following proposition:

Given a complex Banach space H of dimension > 1 and a bounded linear operator T : H → H, then H has a non-trivial closed T-invariant subspace, i.e. there exists a closed linear subspace W of H which is different from {0} and H such that T(W) ⊆ W.

For Banach spaces, the first example of an operator without an invariant subspace was constructed by Enflo. (For Hilbert spaces, the invariant subspace problem remains open.)

Enflo proposed a solution to the invariant subspace problem in 1975, publishing an outline in 1976. Enflo submitted the full article in 1981 and the article's complexity and length delayed its publication to 1987 Enflo's long "manuscript had a world-wide circulation among mathematicians" and some of its ideas were described in publications besides Enflo (1976). Enflo's works inspired a similar construction of an operator without an invariant subspace for example by Beauzamy, who acknowledged Enflo's ideas.

In the 1990s, Enflo developed a "constructive" approach to the invariant subspace problem on Hilbert spaces.

==== Multiplicative inequalities for homogeneous polynomials ====
An essential idea in Enflo's construction was "concentration of polynomials at low degrees": For all positive integers $m$ and $n$, there exists $C(m,n) > 0$ such that for all homogeneous polynomials $P$ and $Q$ of degrees $m$ and $n$ (in $k$ variables), then

$|PQ|\geq C(m,n)|P|\,|Q|,$

where $|P|$ denotes the sum of the absolute values of the coefficients of $P$. Enflo proved that $C(m,n)$ does not depend on the number of variables $k$. Enflo's original proof was simplified by Montgomery.

This result was generalized to other norms on the vector space of homogeneous polynomials. Of these norms, the most used has been the Bombieri norm.

===== Bombieri norm =====
The Bombieri norm is defined in terms of the following scalar product: For all $\alpha,\beta \in \mathbb{N}^N$ we have

$\langle X^\alpha | X^\beta \rangle = 0$ if $\alpha \neq \beta$

For every $\alpha \in \mathbb{N}^N$ we define $\Vert X^\alpha\Vert^2 = \frac{|\alpha|!}{\alpha!},$

where we use the following notation: if $\alpha = (\alpha_1,\dots,\alpha_N) \in \mathbb{N}^N$, we write $|\alpha| = \Sigma_{i=1}^N \alpha_i$ and $\alpha! = \Pi_{i=1}^N (\alpha_i!)$ and $X^\alpha = \Pi_{i=1}^N X_i^{\alpha_i}.$

The most remarkable property of this norm is the Bombieri inequality:

Let $P,Q$ be two homogeneous polynomials respectively of degree $d^\circ(P)$ and $d^\circ(Q)$ with $N$ variables, then, the following inequality holds:

$$\frac{d^\circ(P)!d^\circ(Q)!}{(d^\circ(P)+d^\circ(Q))!}\Vert P\Vert^2 \, \Vert Q\Vert^2 \leq
\Vert P\cdot Q\Vert^2 \leq \Vert P\Vert^2 \, \Vert Q\Vert^2.$$

In the above statement, the Bombieri inequality is the left-hand side inequality; the right-hand side inequality means that the Bombieri norm is a norm of the algebra of polynomials under multiplication.

The Bombieri inequality implies that the product of two polynomials cannot be arbitrarily small, and this lower-bound is fundamental in applications like polynomial factorization (or in Enflo's construction of an operator without an invariant subspace).

==== Applications ====
Enflo's idea of "concentration of polynomials at low degrees" has led to important publications in number theory algebraic and Diophantine geometry, and polynomial factorization.

== Mathematical biology: Population dynamics ==
In applied mathematics, Per Enflo has published several papers in mathematical biology, specifically in population dynamics.

=== Human evolution ===
Enflo has also published in population genetics and paleoanthropology.

Today, all humans belong to one population of Homo sapiens sapiens, which is individed by species barrier. However, according to the "Out of Africa" model this is not the first species of hominids: the first species of genus Homo, Homo habilis, evolved in East Africa at least 2 Ma, and members of this species populated different parts of Africa in a relatively short time. Homo erectus evolved more than 1.8 Ma, and by 1.5 Ma had spread throughout the Old World.

Anthropologists have been divided as to whether the current human population evolved as one interconnected population (as postulated by the Multiregional Evolution hypothesis), or evolved only in East Africa, where they speciated, then migrated out of Africa, replacing human populations in Eurasia (referred to as the "Out of Africa" Model or the "Complete Replacement" Model).

Neanderthals and modern humans coexisted in Europe for several thousand years, but the duration of this period is uncertain. Modern humans may have first migrated to Europe 40–43,000 years ago. Neanderthals may have lived as recently as 24,000 years ago in refugia on the south coast of the Iberian peninsula such as Gorham's Cave. Inter-stratification of Neanderthal and modern human remains has been suggested, but is disputed.

With Hawks and Wolpoff, Enflo published an explanation of fossil evidence on the DNA of Neanderthal and modern humans. This article tries to resolve a debate in the evolution of modern humans between theories suggesting either multiregional and single African origins. In particular, the extinction of Neanderthals could have happened due to waves of modern humans entered Europe – in technical terms, due to "the continuous influx of modern human DNA into the Neandertal gene pool."

Enflo has also written about the population dynamics of zebra mussels in Lake Erie.

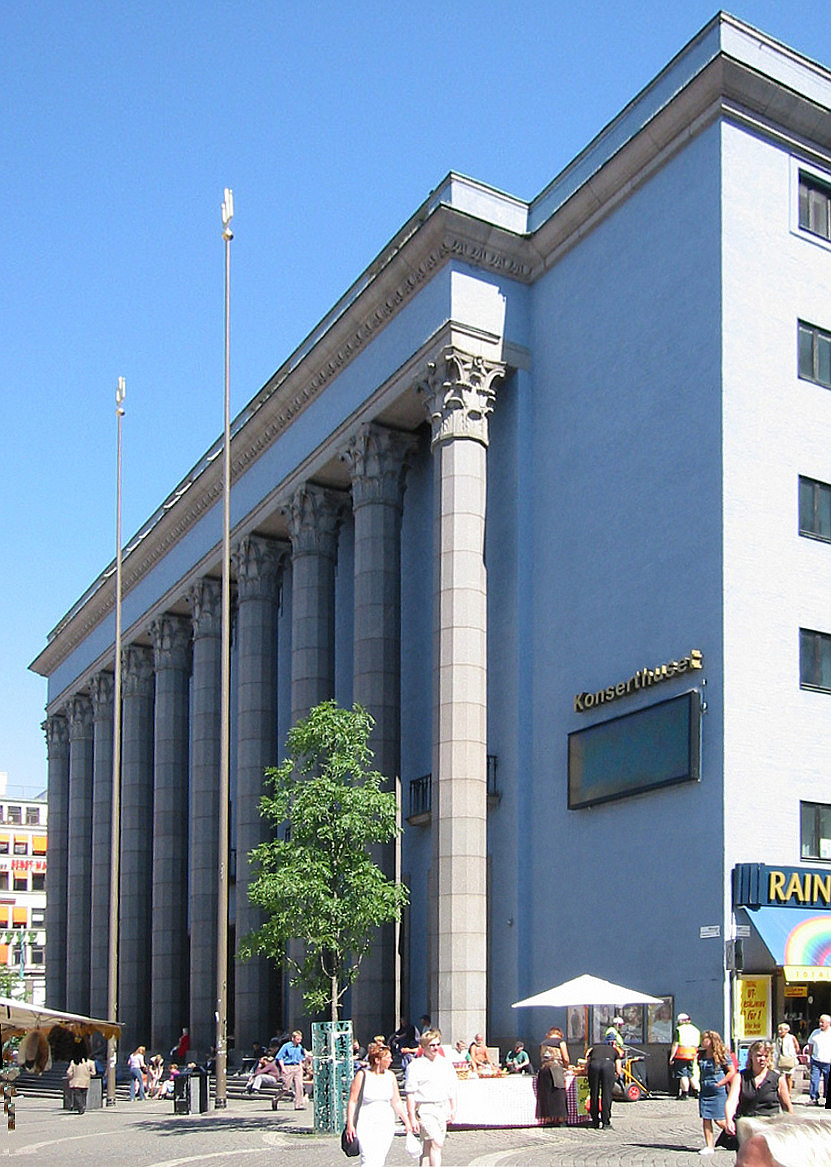
A concert pianist, Per Enflo debuted at the Stockholm Concert Hall in 1963.

== Piano ==
Per Enflo was also a concert pianist.

A child prodigy in both music and mathematics, Enflo won the Swedish competition for young pianists at age 11 in 1956, and he won the same competition in 1961. At age 12, Enflo appeared as a soloist with the Royal Opera Orchestra of Sweden. He debuted in the Stockholm Concert Hall in 1963. Enflo's teachers included Bruno Seidlhofer, Géza Anda, and Gottfried Boon (who himself was a student of Artur Schnabel).

In 1999 Enflo competed in the first annual Van Cliburn Foundation's International Piano Competition for Outstanding Amateurs.

Enflo performed around Kent and in a Mozart series in Columbus, Ohio (with the Triune Festival Orchestra). His solo piano recitals have appeared on the Classics Network of the radio station WOSU, which was sponsored by Ohio State University.

== External sources ==
- Biography of Per Enflo at Canisius College
- Homepage of Per Enflo at Kent State University
- Enflo, Per (25 April 2011). "Personal notes, in my own words". perenflo.com. Archived from the original on 26 April 2012.
- Per Enflo at the Mathematics Genealogy Project
