= Stefan Kaczmarz =

Polish mathematician (1895–1939)

- Born: 20 March 1895; Sambor, Galicia, Austria-Hungary (now Sambir, Ukraine)
- Died: 1939
- Education: Jagiellonian University
- Known for: Kaczmarz method
- Spouse: Helena Firlcińska
- Awards: Cross of Independence; Golden Cross of Merit; Bronze Medal for Long Service
- Scientific career
- Fields: Mathematics
- Workplaces: Jan Kazimierz University; Lwów Polytechnic
- Thesis: The relationships between certain functional and differential equations.
- Academic advisors: Stanisław Ruziewicz

Stefan Marian Kaczmarz (Polish: [ˈkat͡ʂmaʐ]; 20 March 1895 – 1939) was a Polish mathematician and a representative of the Lwów School of Mathematics. He is known for introducing the Kaczmarz method, which provided the basis for many modern imaging technologies, including the CAT scan.

Kaczmarz was a professor of mathematics in the faculty of mechanical engineering of Jan Kazimierz University of Lwów from 1923 to 1939, where he collaborated with Stefan Banach.

== Life and career ==
=== Early life and education ===
Born in 1895 in Sambor, Kingdom of Galicia and Lodomeria in Austria-Hungary (now Sambir, Ukraine), to father Mikołaj, who worked as a court clerk, and mother Emilia (née Smyczyńska). He had three siblings: sister Helena, and two brothers, Roman and Eustachy. In 1901–1905, he went to primary school in Kęty. He then attended state gymnasiums in Wadowice (1905–1907) and Tarnów (1907–1913). After graduating with honours, Kaczmarz enrolled at the Jagiellonian University in Kraków to pursue studies in mathematics, physics and chemistry. His professors included some prominent figures of the time, such as Stanisław Zaremba, Marian Smoluchowski, Jan Śleszyński and Kazimierz Żorawski.

=== World War I ===
His studies were interrupted by the outbreak of World War I. Kaczmarz enlisted in the Polish Legions where he reached the rank of sergeant and participated in the Carpathian Campaign against the Russian forces until 1917. He was subsequently transferred to the School of Artillery in Walawa. Kaczmarz was interned by the Austrian authorities following his refusal to take an oath of allegiance to the emperor. In 1918, he was released and resumed his studies at the university, which he completed in 1922. In 1921–23, he was employed as an assistant in the Department of Mathematics of the Academy of Mining in Kraków. At that time, Kaczmarz additionally worked as a maths teacher at a private school for girls in Kraków.

=== Lviv period ===
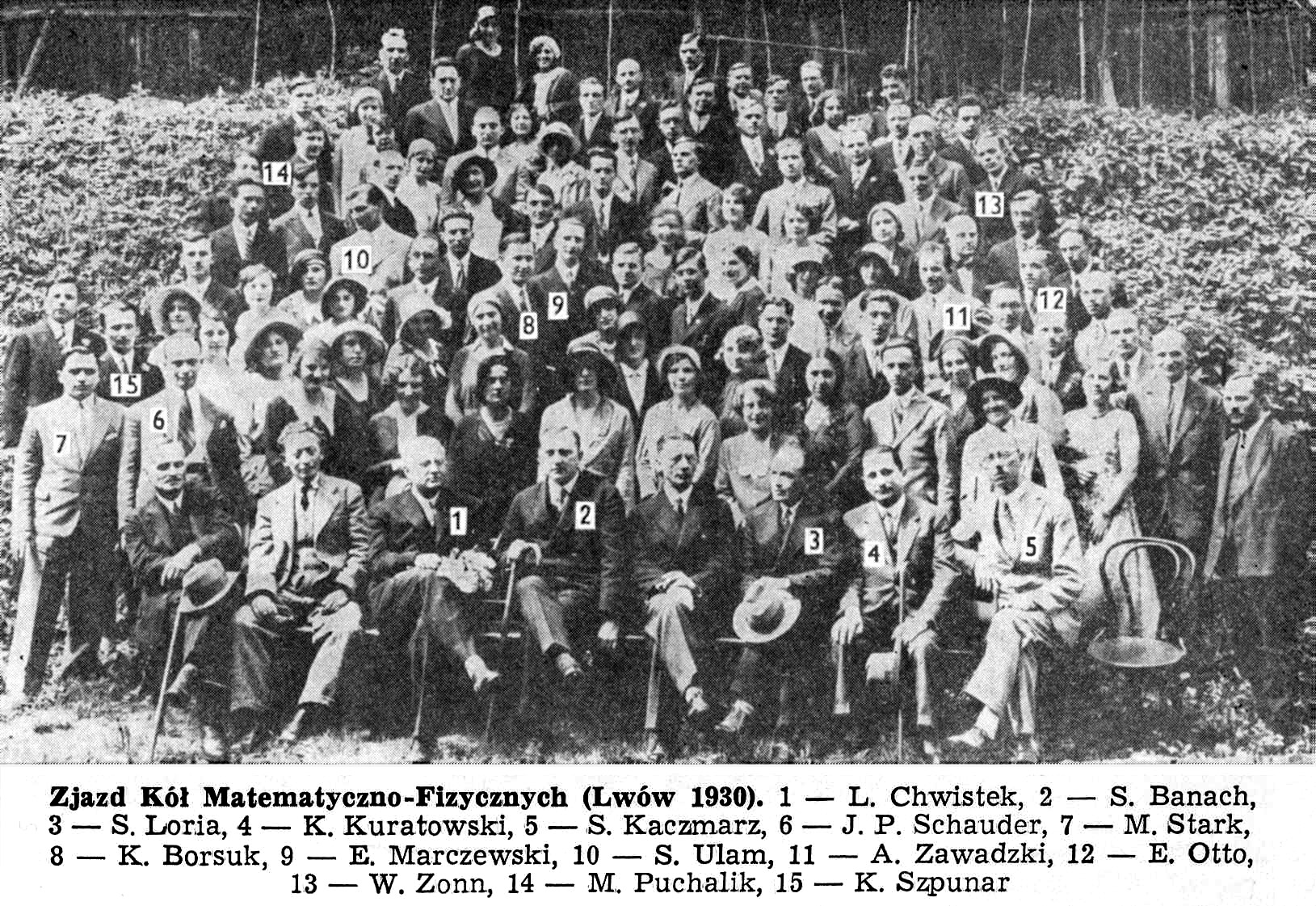
Kaczmarz (first row, far right) with fellow Lviv mathematicians in 1930.

In 1923, Kaczmarz relocated to Lwów after having received an offer from the John Casimir University arranged for him personally by Stefan Banach, an extraordinary professor at the university, who was strongly committed to the idea of establishing Lwów as a major research centre in mathematics. He taught at the Faculty of Mechanical Engineering and was influenced in his first years in Lwów by his collaborations with Stanisław Saks and Stanisław Ruziewicz. He later worked with Józef Marcinkiewicz and produced a joint paper on multipliers of orthongonal systems.

In 1924, he obtained his doctorate based on his thesis entitled The relationships between certain functional and differential equations. His findings from the thesis were published in Fundamenta Mathematicae in the same year. In 1925, he was promoted to the rank of second lieutenant in the Polish Army. In 1929, he received his habilitation. Kaczmarz also took part in the famous discussions at the Scottish Café attended by renowned mathematicians including Stefan Banach, Stanisław Mazur, Władysław Orlicz, Stanisław Ulam and Mark Kac.

In 1928, he married teacher Helena Firlcińcka in Nowy Sącz with whom he had two daughters. In 1932, after having been granted a scholarship by the National Culture Fund, he travelled to Cambridge where he met G. H. Hardy and Raymond Paley and participated in lectures on Fourier transform delivered by Norbert Wiener. He then spent brief time in Göttingen and came back to Lwów. In 1933, he became the recipient of the Cross of Independence. In 1935, he was appointed an assistant professor at the Lviv Polytechnic. The following year, he became a member of the Lwów Scientific Society. In 1937, he was awarded the Golden Cross of Merit.

=== Death ===
The circumstances of Kaczmarz's death are unclear. In early September 1939, after World War II broke out, he was called up for Polish military service as a reserve lieutenant. He sent a letter to his wife on 4 September and was not heard from afterwards. Theories for his death include the possibility that he died soon after near Nisko (the source of his last letter to his wife) in a German bombing raid on a train he was traveling in, that he died later that month in combat against the Germans near Umiastów, or that he was murdered by the NKVD in April or May 1940 as part of the Katyń massacre.

== Work ==
Kaczmarz belonged to a group of collaborators of Stefan Banach and is regarded as a representative of the Lwów School of Mathematics. He mainly worked in algebra, real analysis, Fourier series, and orthogonal functions. He is perhaps most well-known for introducing the Kaczmarz method, an iterative algorithm for solving linear equation systems, which laid the foundation for developing many modern imaging technologies, including the CAT scan. It was originally published in his paper entitled Angenäherte Auflösung von Systemen linearer Gleichungen and appeared in the Bulletin International de l'Académie Polonaise des Sciences et des Lettres in 1937 after having been presented to the journal by Tadeusz Banachiewicz.

== See also ==
- Warsaw School of Mathematics
- Polish School of Mathematics
- List of Polish mathematicians
