= Banach–Mazur theorem =

In functional analysis, a field of mathematics, a key object of study is a normed space, which is a vector space equipped with a norm, which allows vectors to be measured. When they are infinite dimensional, normed spaces can be very complicated. A standard normed space is the space $C([0,1],\mathbb R)$ of continuous functions on the unit interval, $f:[0,1]\to\mathbb R$, which is equipped with the norm $\|f\| = \max_{x\in [0,1]}|f(x)|$, the maximum value of the function.

The Banach–Mazur theorem is a theorem that provides one way of bounding the complexity of certain well-behaved normed spaces (separable). It states that every such normed space can be embedded into the normed space $C([0,1],\mathbb R)$, in such a way that the norm (length) of every vector is preserved (a property known as an isometry). It is named after Stefan Banach and Stanisław Mazur.

== Statement ==
Every real, separable Banach space (X, || ⋅ ||) is isometrically isomorphic to a closed subspace of C^{0}([0, 1], R), the space of all continuous functions from the unit interval into the real line.

== Comments ==
On the one hand, the Banach–Mazur theorem seems to tell us that the seemingly vast collection of all separable Banach spaces is not that vast or difficult to work with, since a separable Banach space is "only" a collection of continuous paths. On the other hand, the theorem tells us that C^{0}([0, 1], R) is a "really big" space, big enough to contain every possible separable Banach space.

Non-separable Banach spaces cannot embed isometrically in the separable space C^{0}([0, 1], R), but for every Banach space X, one can find a compact Hausdorff space K and an isometric linear embedding j of X into the space C(K) of scalar continuous functions on K. The simplest choice is to let K be the unit ball of the continuous dual X ′, equipped with the w*-topology. This unit ball K is then compact by the Banach–Alaoglu theorem. The embedding j is introduced by saying that for every x ∈ X, the continuous function j(x) on K is defined by

$$\forall x' \in K: \qquad j(x)(x') = x'(x).$$

The mapping j is linear, and it is isometric by the Hahn–Banach theorem.

Another generalization was given by Kleiber and Pervin (1969): a metric space of density equal to an infinite cardinal α is isometric to a subspace of C^{0}([0,1]^{α}, R), the space of real continuous functions on the product of α copies of the unit interval.

== Stronger versions of the theorem ==
Let us write C^{k}[0, 1] for C^{k}([0, 1], R). In 1995, Luis Rodríguez-Piazza proved that the isometry i : X → C^{0}[0, 1] can be chosen so that every non-zero function in the image i(X) is nowhere differentiable. Put another way, if D ⊂ C^{0}[0, 1] consists of functions that are differentiable at at least one point of [0, 1], then i can be chosen so that i(X) ∩ D = {0}. This conclusion applies to the space C^{0}[0, 1] itself, hence there exists a linear map i : C^{0}[0, 1] → C^{0}[0, 1] that is an isometry onto its image, such that image under i of C^{0}[0, 1] (the subspace consisting of functions that are everywhere differentiable with continuous derivative) intersects D only at 0: thus the space of smooth functions (with respect to the uniform distance) is isometrically isomorphic to a space of nowhere-differentiable functions. Note that the (metrically incomplete) space of smooth functions is dense in C^{0}[0, 1].
