= Schauder basis =

Computational tool

In mathematics, a Schauder basis or countable basis is similar to the usual (Hamel) basis of a vector space; the difference is that Hamel bases use linear combinations that are finite sums, while for Schauder bases they may be infinite sums. This makes Schauder bases more suitable for the analysis of infinite-dimensional topological vector spaces including Banach spaces.

Schauder bases were described by Juliusz Schauder in 1927, although such bases were discussed earlier. For example, the Haar basis was given in 1909, and Georg Faber discussed in 1910 a basis for continuous functions on an interval, sometimes called a Faber–Schauder system.

== Definitions ==
Let V denote a topological vector space over the field F. A Schauder basis is a sequence {b_{n}} of elements of V such that for every element v ∈ V there exists a unique sequence {α_{n}} of scalars in F so that
$$v = \sum_{n=0}^\infty{\alpha_nb_n}\text{.}$$
The convergence of the infinite sum is implicitly that of the ambient topology, i.e.,
$$\lim_{n \to \infty}{\sum_{k=0}^n \alpha_k b_k}=v\text{,}$$
but can be reduced to only weak convergence in a normed vector space (such as a Banach space). Unlike a Hamel basis, the elements of the basis must be ordered, since the series may not converge unconditionally.

Note that some authors define Schauder bases to be countable (as above), while others use the term to include uncountable bases. In either case, the sums themselves always are countable. An uncountable Schauder basis is a linearly ordered set rather than a sequence, and each sum inherits the order of its terms from this linear ordering. They can and do arise in practice. As an example, a separable Hilbert space can only have a countable Schauder basis, but a non-separable Hilbert space may have an uncountable one.

Though the definition above technically does not require a normed space, a norm is necessary to say almost anything useful about Schauder bases. The results below assume the existence of a norm.

A Schauder basis {b_{n}}_{n ≥ 0} is said to be normalized when all the basis vectors have norm 1 in the Banach space V.

A sequence {x_{n}}_{n ≥ 0} in V is a basic sequence if it is a Schauder basis of its closed linear span.

Two Schauder bases, {b_{n}} in V and {c_{n}} in W, are said to be equivalent if there exist two constants c > 0 and C such that for every natural number N ≥ 0 and all sequences {α_{n}} of scalars,

$$c \left \| \sum_{k=0}^N \alpha_k b_k \right\|_V  \le \left \| \sum_{k=0}^N \alpha_k c_k \right \|_W \le C \left \| \sum_{k=0}^N \alpha_k b_k \right \|_V.$$

A family of vectors in V is total if its linear span (the set of finite linear combinations) is dense in V. If V is a Hilbert space, an orthogonal basis is a total subset B of V such that elements in B are nonzero and pairwise orthogonal. Further, when each element in B has norm 1, then B is an orthonormal basis of V.

== Properties ==
Let {b_{n}} be a Schauder basis of a Banach space V over F = R or C. It is a subtle consequence of the open mapping theorem that the linear mappings {P_{n}} defined by

$$v = \sum_{k=0}^\infty \alpha_k b_k \ \ \overset{\textstyle P_n}{\longrightarrow} \ \ P_n(v) = \sum_{k = 0}^n \alpha_k b_k$$

are uniformly bounded by some constant C. When C = 1, the basis is called a monotone basis. The maps {P_{n}} are the basis projections.

Let {b*_{n}} denote the coordinate functionals, where b*_{n} assigns to every vector v in V the coordinate α_{n} of v in the above expansion. Each b*_{n} is a bounded linear functional on V. Indeed, for every vector v in V,

$$|b^*_n(v)| \; \|b_n\|_V = |\alpha_n| \; \|b_n\|_V = \|\alpha_n b_n\|_V = \|P_n(v) - P_{n-1}(v)\|_V \le 2 C \|v\|_V.$$

These functionals {b*_{n}} are called biorthogonal functionals associated to the basis {b_{n}}. When the basis {b_{n}} is normalized, the coordinate functionals {b*_{n}} have norm ≤ 2C in the continuous dual V ′ of V.

Since every vector v in a Banach space V with a Schauder basis is the limit of P_{n}(v), with P_{n} of finite rank and uniformly bounded, such a space V satisfies the bounded approximation property.

A Banach space with a Schauder basis is necessarily separable, but the converse is false. The basis problem is the question asked by Banach, whether every separable Banach space has a Schauder basis. This was negatively answered by Per Enflo who constructed a reflexive and separable Banach space failing the approximation property, thus a space without a Schauder basis. The construction has been simplified and generalized over the years. See Fabian et al. (2011, Sec. 16.5) for a modern presentation.

A theorem attributed to Mazur asserts that every infinite-dimensional Banach space V contains a basic sequence, i.e., there is an infinite-dimensional subspace of V that has a Schauder basis.

== Examples ==
The standard unit vector bases of c_{0}, and of ℓ^{p} for 1 ≤ p < ∞, are monotone Schauder bases. In this unit vector basis {b_{n}}, the vector b_{n} in V = c_{0} or in V = ℓ^{p} is the scalar sequence [b_{n, j}]_{j} where all coordinates b_{n, j} are 0, except the nth coordinate:

$$b_n = \{b_{n, j}\}_{j=0}^\infty \in V, \ \ b_{n, j} = \delta_{n, j},$$

where δ_{n, j} is the Kronecker delta. The space ℓ^{∞} is not separable, and therefore has no Schauder basis.

Every orthonormal basis in a separable Hilbert space is a Schauder basis. Every countable orthonormal basis is equivalent to the standard unit vector basis in ℓ^{2}.

Every Auerbach basis in a separable Banach space is a Schauder basis.

The Haar system is an example of a basis for L^{p}([0, 1]), when 1 ≤ p < ∞. When 1 < p < ∞, another example is the trigonometric system defined below. The Banach space C([0, 1]) of continuous functions on the interval [0, 1], with the supremum norm, admits a Schauder basis. The Faber–Schauder system is the most commonly used monotone Schauder basis for C([0, 1]).

Several bases for classical spaces were discovered before Banach's book appeared (Banach (1932)), but some other cases remained open for a long time. For example, the question of whether the disk algebra A(D) has a Schauder basis remained open for more than forty years, until Bočkarev showed in 1974 that a basis constructed from the Franklin system exists in A(D). One can also prove that the periodic Franklin system is a basis for a Banach space A_{r} isomorphic to A(D).

This space A_{r} consists of all complex continuous functions on the unit circle T whose conjugate function is also continuous. The Franklin system is another Schauder basis for C([0, 1]), and it is a Schauder basis in L^{p}([0, 1]) when 1 ≤ p < ∞. Systems derived from the Franklin system give bases in the space C^{1}([0, 1]^{2}) of differentiable functions on the unit square. The existence of a Schauder basis in C^{1}([0, 1]^{2}) was a question from Banach's book.

=== Relation to Fourier series ===
Let {x_{n}} be, in the real case, the sequence of functions

$$\{ 1, \cos (x), \sin (x), \cos(2x), \sin(2x), \cos(3x), \sin(3x), \ldots \}$$

or, in the complex case,

$$\left \{ 1, e^{ix}, e^{-ix}, e^{2ix}, e^{-2ix}, e^{3ix}, e^{-3ix}, \ldots \right \}.$$

The sequence {x_{n}} is called the trigonometric system. It is a Schauder basis for the space L^{p}([0, 2π]) for any p such that 1 < p < ∞. For p = 2, this is the content of the Riesz–Fischer theorem, and for p ≠ 2, it is a consequence of the boundedness on the space L^{p}([0, 2π]) of the Hilbert transform on the circle. It follows from this boundedness that the projections P_{N} defined by

$$\left \{ f : x \to \sum_{k=-\infty}^{+\infty} c_k e^{i k x} \right \} \ \overset{P_N}{\longrightarrow} \ \left \{ P_N f : x \to \sum_{k=-N}^{N} c_k e^{i k x} \right \}$$

are uniformly bounded on L^{p}([0, 2π]) when 1 < p < ∞. This family of maps {P_{N}} is equicontinuous and tends to the identity on the dense subset consisting of trigonometric polynomials. It follows that P_{N}f tends to f in L^{p}-norm for every f ∈ L^{p}([0, 2π]). In other words, {x_{n}} is a Schauder basis of L^{p}([0, 2π]).

However, the set {x_{n}} is not a Schauder basis for L^{1}([0, 2π]). This means that there are functions in L^{1} whose Fourier series does not converge in the L^{1} norm, or equivalently, that the projections P_{N} are not uniformly bounded in L^{1}-norm. Also, the set {x_{n}} is not a Schauder basis for C([0, 2π]).

=== Bases for spaces of operators ===
The space K(ℓ^{2}) of compact operators on the Hilbert space ℓ^{2} has a Schauder basis. For every x, y in ℓ^{2}, let x ⊗ y denote the rank one operator v ∈ ℓ^{2} → <v, x > y. If {e_{n}}_{n ≥ 1} is the standard orthonormal basis of ℓ^{2}, a basis for K(ℓ^{2}) is given by the sequence

$$\begin{align}  & e_1 \otimes e_1, \ \ e_1 \otimes e_2, \; e_2 \otimes e_2, \; e_2 \otimes e_1, \ldots, \\
& e_1 \otimes e_n, e_2 \otimes e_n, \ldots,  e_n \otimes e_n, e_n \otimes e_{n-1}, \ldots, e_n \otimes e_1, \ldots \end{align}$$

For every n, the sequence consisting of the n^{2} first vectors in this basis is a suitable ordering of the family {e_{j} ⊗ e_{k}}, for 1 ≤ j, k ≤ n.

The preceding result can be generalized: a Banach space X with a basis has the approximation property, so the space K(X) of compact operators on X is isometrically isomorphic to the injective tensor product

$$X' \widehat \otimes_\varepsilon X \simeq \mathcal{K}(X).$$

If X is a Banach space with a Schauder basis {e_{n}}_{n ≥ 1} such that the biorthogonal functionals are a basis of the dual, that is to say, a Banach space with a shrinking basis, then the space K(X) admits a basis formed by the rank one operators e*_{j} ⊗ e_{k} : v → e*_{j}(v) e_{k}, with the same ordering as before. This applies in particular to every reflexive Banach space X with a Schauder basis.

On the other hand, the space B(ℓ^{2}) has no basis, since it is non-separable. Moreover, B(ℓ^{2}) does not have the approximation property.

== Unconditionality ==
A Schauder basis {b_{n}} is unconditional if whenever the series $\sum \alpha_nb_n$ converges, it converges unconditionally. For a Schauder basis {b_{n}}, this is equivalent to the existence of a constant C such that

$$\Bigl\| \sum_{k=0}^n \varepsilon_k \alpha_k b_k \Bigr\|_V \le C \Bigl\| \sum_{k=0}^n \alpha_k b_k \Bigr\|_V$$

for all natural numbers n, all scalar coefficients {α_{k}} and all signs ε_{k} = ±1. Unconditionality is an important property since it allows one to forget about the order of summation. A Schauder basis is symmetric if it is unconditional and uniformly equivalent to all its permutations: there exists a constant C such that for every natural number n, every permutation π of the set {0, 1, ..., n}, all scalar coefficients {α_{k}} and all signs {ε_{k}},

$$\Bigl\| \sum_{k=0}^n \varepsilon_k \alpha_k b_{\pi(k)} \Bigr\|_V \le C \Bigl\| \sum_{k=0}^n \alpha_k b_k \Bigr\|_V.$$

The standard bases of the sequence spaces c_{0} and ℓ^{p} for 1 ≤ p < ∞, as well as every orthonormal basis in a Hilbert space, are unconditional. These bases are also symmetric.

The trigonometric system is not an unconditional basis in L^{p}, except for p = 2.

The Haar system is an unconditional basis in L^{p} for any 1 < p < ∞. The space L^{1}([0, 1]) has no unconditional basis.

A natural question is whether every infinite-dimensional Banach space has an infinite-dimensional subspace with an unconditional basis. This was solved negatively by Timothy Gowers and Bernard Maurey in 1992.

== Schauder bases and duality ==
A basis {e_{n}}_{n≥0} of a Banach space X is boundedly complete if for every sequence {a_{n}}_{n≥0} of scalars such that the partial sums

$$V_n =  \sum_{k=0}^n a_k e_k$$

are bounded in X, the sequence {V_{n}} converges in X. The unit vector basis for ℓ^{p}, 1 ≤ p < ∞, is boundedly complete. However, the unit vector basis is not boundedly complete in c_{0}. Indeed, if a_{n} = 1 for every n, then

$$\|V_n\|_{c_0} = \max_{0 \le k \le n} |a_k| = 1$$

for every n, but the sequence {V_{n}} is not convergent in c_{0}, since ||V_{n+1} − V_{n}|| = 1 for every n.

A space X with a boundedly complete basis {e_{n}}_{n≥0} is isomorphic to a dual space, namely, the space X is isomorphic to the dual of the closed linear span in the dual X ′ of the biorthogonal functionals associated to the basis {e_{n}}.

A basis {e_{n}}_{n≥0} of X is shrinking if for every bounded linear functional f on X, the sequence of non-negative numbers

$$\varphi_n = \sup \{|f(x)| : x \in F_n, \; \|x\| \le 1 \}$$

tends to 0 when n → ∞, where F_{n} is the linear span of the basis vectors e_{m} for m ≥ n. The unit vector basis for ℓ^{p}, 1 < p < ∞, or for c_{0}, is shrinking. It is not shrinking in ℓ^{1}: if f is the bounded linear functional on ℓ^{1} given by

$$f : x = \{x_n\} \in \ell^1 \ \rightarrow \ \sum_{n=0}^{\infty} x_n,$$

then φ_{n} ≥ f(e_{n}) = 1 for every n.

A basis [e_{n}]_{n ≥ 0} of X is shrinking if and only if the biorthogonal functionals [e*_{n}]_{n ≥ 0} form a basis of the dual X ′.

Robert C. James characterized reflexivity in Banach spaces with basis: the space X with a Schauder basis is reflexive if and only if the basis is both shrinking and boundedly complete. James also proved that a space with an unconditional basis is non-reflexive if and only if it contains a subspace isomorphic to c_{0} or ℓ^{1}.

== Related concepts ==
A Hamel basis is a subset B of a vector space V such that every element v ∈ V can uniquely be written as

$$v = \sum_{b \in B} \alpha_b b$$

with α_{b} ∈ F, with the extra condition that the set

$$\{ b \in B \mid \alpha_b \neq 0 \}$$

is finite. This property makes the Hamel basis unwieldy for infinite-dimensional Banach spaces; as a Hamel basis for an infinite-dimensional Banach space has to be uncountable. (Every finite-dimensional subspace of an infinite-dimensional Banach space X has empty interior, and is nowhere dense in X. It then follows from the Baire category theorem that a countable union of bases of these finite-dimensional subspaces cannot serve as a basis.)

== See also ==
- Markushevich basis
- Generalized Fourier series
- Orthogonal polynomials
- Haar wavelet
- Banach space
