= Angela Spalsbury =

American mathematician (born 1967)

Angela Sue Spalsbury (born 1967) is an American mathematician specializing in functional analysis. She is a former president of Pi Mu Epsilon, the dean and chief administrator of the Geauga campus of Kent State University, and the co-author of a book on Haar measure, The Joys of Haar Measure, with Joe Diestel.

Spalsbury earned her bachelor's degree from Kent State. She has two master's degrees, one from Kent State and another from the University of Pretoria. She completed her doctorate at Kent State in 1996; her dissertation, Cyclic Vectors and Extremal Vectors of Linear Operators, was supervised by Per Enflo. She was on the faculty of Youngstown State University from 2001 until 2017, serving as chair of mathematics and statistics there from 2013 to 2017. She also co-advised the Youngstown student chapter of the Association for Women in Mathematics (AWM), which under her mentorship won the inaugural Professional Development Award of the AWM in recognition of their efforts to encourage female students in mathematics. In 2018, Spalsbury returned to Kent State as dean.
