= Ruziewicz problem =

In mathematics, the Ruziewicz problem (sometimes Banach–Ruziewicz problem) in measure theory asks whether the usual Lebesgue measure on the n-sphere is characterised, up to proportionality, by its properties of being finitely additive, invariant under rotations, and defined on all Lebesgue measurable sets.

This was answered affirmatively and independently for n ≥ 4 by Grigory Margulis and Dennis Sullivan around 1980, and for n = 2 and 3 by Vladimir Drinfeld (published 1984). It fails for the circle.

The problem is named after Stanisław Ruziewicz.
