= Determinant method =

In mathematics, the determinant method is any of a family of techniques in analytic number theory.

The name was coined by Roger Heath-Brown and comes from the fact that the center piece of the method is estimating a certain determinant. Its main application is to give an upper bound for the number of rational points of bounded height on or near algebraic varieties defined over the rational numbers. The main novelty of the determinant method is that in all incarnations, the estimates obtained are uniform with respect to the coefficients of the polynomials defining the variety and only depend on the degree and dimension of the variety.

== Development ==
The original version of the determinant method was developed by Enrico Bombieri and Jonathan Pila in 1989. In its original context, Bombieri and Pila's results applied only to $\mathbb{A}^2$ as their arguments depended heavily on the geometry of the plane. The Bombieri-Pila version of the determinant method would later be dubbed the real-analytic determinant method. Oscar Marmon generalized Bombieri and Pila's results in 2010.

Bombieri and Pila's result was novel because of its uniformity with respect to the polynomials defining the curves. Roger Heath-Brown obtained the analogous result of Bombieri and Pila in higher dimensions in 2002, using a different argument. Heath-Brown's approach would later be dubbed the local p-adic determinant method. The main use of Heath-Brown's determinant method has been to try to solve the so-called dimension growth conjecture.

Aside from the real-analytic approach of Bombieri and Pila and Heath-Brown's local $p$-adic approach, other approaches include the approximate determinant method also due to Heath-Brown, the global determinant method of Salberger, and a new variant of the approximate determinant method due to Dietmann and Marmon which applies to polynomials which are close to being bihomogeneous.

In 2012, this method is reformulated by the language of Arakelov theory by Huayi Chen. This formulation was further studied by Chunhui Liu in 2022.

In 2016, Stanley Yao Xiao obtained a generalization of Salberger's global determinant method to the setting of weighted projective space.

Substantial progress was made by Marcelo Paredes and Román Sasyk in 2022 where they generalized the main theorems of the (global) determinant method to global fields, and in particular number fields.
