= Lwów School of Mathematics =

Research collective

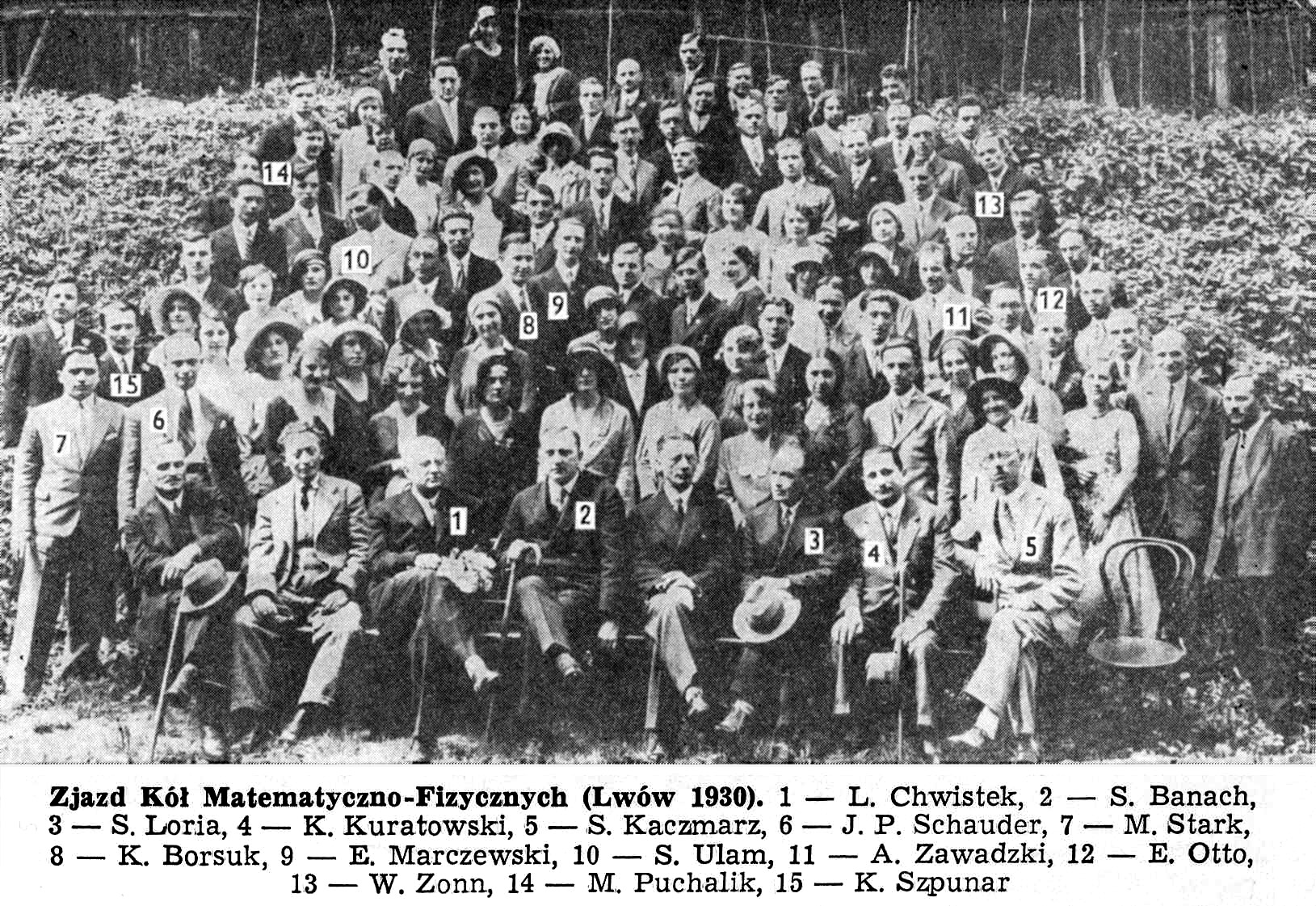
Lwów School of Mathematics, 1930

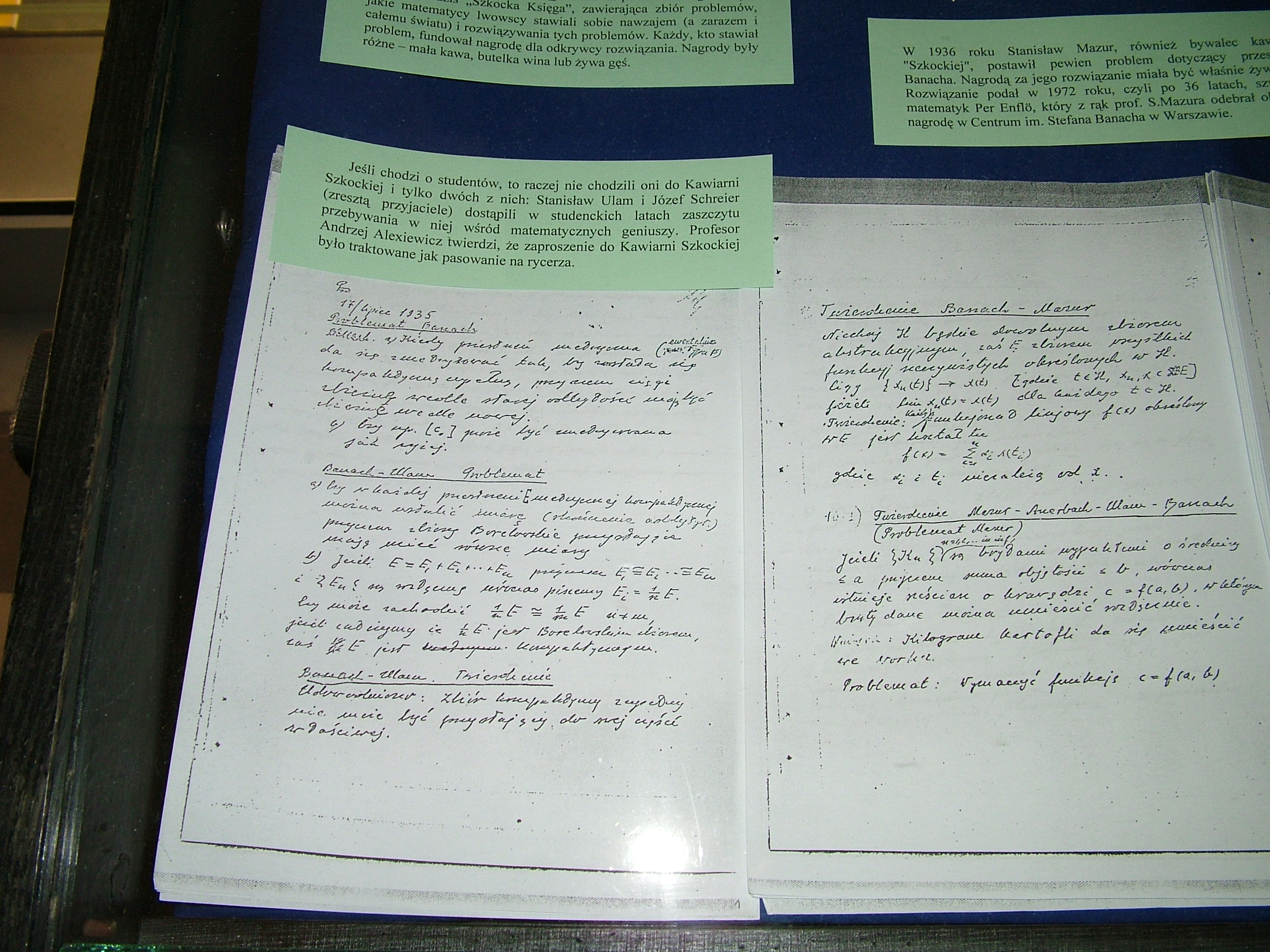
Part of the Scottish Book with Stefan Banach's and Stanisław Ulam's notes

The Lwów school of mathematics (Polish: Lwowska szkoła matematyczna) was a group of Polish mathematicians who worked in the interwar period in Lwów, Poland (since 1945 Lviv, Ukraine). The mathematicians often met at the famous Scottish Café to discuss mathematical problems, and published in the journal Studia Mathematica, founded in 1929. The school was renowned for its productivity and its extensive contributions to subjects such as point-set topology, set theory and functional analysis.

== Members ==
Notable members of the Lwów school of mathematics included:

- Stefan Banach
- Feliks Barański
- Władysław Orlicz
- Stanisław Saks
- Hugo Steinhaus
- Stanisław Mazur
- Stanisław Ulam
- Józef Schreier
- Juliusz Schauder
- Mark Kac
- Antoni Łomnicki
- Stefan Kaczmarz
- Herman Auerbach
- Włodzimierz Stożek
- Stanisław Ruziewicz
- Eustachy Żyliński

The biographies and contributions of these mathematicians were documented in 1980 by their contemporary, Kazimierz Kuratowski in his book A Half Century of Polish Mathematics: Remembrances and Reflections.

== The end of the school ==
First the Soviet annexation of Eastern Galicia and Volhynia in 1939, then the German invasion of the Soviet Union in 1941, caused many of the mathematicians to flee Lwów. Few of them survived World War II, but after the war a group including some of the original community carried on their work in Wrocław in Silesia, after the post-war Polish population transfers. A number of the prewar mathematicians, prominent among them Stanisław Ulam, became famous for work done in the United States.

== See also ==
- Kraków School of Mathematics
- Lwów–Warsaw school
- Polish School of Mathematics
- Scottish Café
- Warsaw School of Mathematics
