= Stanisław Ruziewicz =

Polish mathematician (1889–1941)

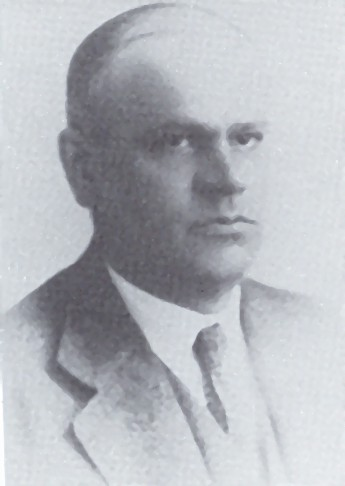
- Stanisław Ruziewicz (c.a. 1939)
- Born: 29 August 1889; Kołomyja (uk. Коломия)
- Died: 12 July 1941 (aged 51); Lwów (today Lviv, Ukraine), Nazi-occupied Poland
- Education: University of Lwów
- Known for: Ruziewicz problem
- Scientific career
- Fields: Mathematics
- Workplaces: Jan Kazimierz University, Academy of Foreign Trade in Lwów
- Doctoral advisor: Wacław Sierpiński
- Doctoral students: Stefan Kaczmarz

Stanisław Ruziewicz (29 August 1889 – 12 July 1941) was a Polish mathematician and one of the founders of the Lwów School of Mathematics.

He was a former student of Wacław Sierpiński, earning his doctorate in 1913 from the University of Lwów; his thesis concerned continuous functions that are not differentiable. He became a professor at the same university (then named Jan Kazimierz University) and rector of the Academy of Foreign Trade in Lwów. During the Second World War, Ruziewicz's home city of Lwów was annexed by the Ukrainian Soviet Socialist Republic, but then taken over by the General Government of German-occupied Poland in July 1941; Ruziewicz was arrested and murdered by the Gestapo on 12 July 1941 in Lwów, during the Massacre of Lwów professors.

The Ruziewicz problem, asking whether the Lebesgue measure on the sphere may be characterized by certain of its properties, is named after him.
