= Studia Mathematica =

- Discipline: Mathematics
- Language: English, French, German, Russian
- Edited by: Adam Skalski

Publication details
- History: 1929–present
- Publisher: Polish Academy of Sciences (Poland)
- Frequency: 18/year
- Open access: Hybrid
- Impact factor: 0.955 (2019)

Standard abbreviations
- ISO 4: Stud. Math.
- MathSciNet: Studia Math.

Indexing
- ISSN: 0039-3223 (print); 1730-6337 (web)
- LCCN: 30016093
- OCLC no.: 989577902

Links
- Journal homepage; Online archive

Studia Mathematica is a triannual peer-reviewed scientific journal of mathematics published by the Polish Academy of Sciences. Papers are written in English, French, German, or Russian, primarily covering functional analysis, abstract methods of mathematical analysis, and probability theory. The editor-in-chief is Adam Skalski.

== History ==
The journal was established in 1929 by Stefan Banach and Hugo Steinhaus and its first editors were Banach, Steinhaus and Herman Auerbach.

Due to the Second World War publication stopped after volume 9 (1940) and was not resumed until volume 10 in 1948.

== Abstracting and indexing ==
The journal is abstracted and indexed in:

- Current Contents/Physical, Chemical & Earth Sciences
- MathSciNet
- Science Citation Index
- Scopus
- Zentralblatt MATH

According to the Journal Citation Reports, the journal has a 2018 impact factor of 0.617.
