= Bernard Maurey =

French mathematician (born 1948)

Bernard Maurey (born 1948) is a French mathematician who deals with functional analysis and especially the theory of Banach spaces.

He received in 1973 his Ph.D. from the University Paris VII (Denis Diderot) under Laurent Schwartz with thesis Théorèmes de factorisation pour les opérateurs linéaires à valeurs dans les espaces L^{p}. Maurey is a professor at the University of Paris VII and a member of the CNRS's Laboratoire d'Analyse et de Mathématiques Appliquées of the University of Marne-la-Vallée. He was an Invited Speaker of the International Congress of Mathematicians in 1974 in Vancouver.

He introduced stable Banach spaces in 1981 with Jean-Louis Krivine. In 1992, with Timothy Gowers, Maurey resolved the "unconditional basic sequence problem" in the theory of Banach spaces, by showing that not every infinite-dimensional Banach space has an infinite-dimensional subspace that admits an unconditional Schauder basis.
