= Bombieri norm =

In mathematics, the Bombieri norm, named after Enrico Bombieri, is a norm on homogeneous polynomials with coefficient in $\mathbb R$ or $\mathbb C$ (there is also a version for non homogeneous univariate polynomials). This norm has many remarkable properties, the most important being listed in this article.

== Bombieri scalar product for homogeneous polynomials ==
To start with the geometry, the Bombieri scalar product for homogeneous polynomials with N variables can be defined as follows using multi-index notation:
$$\forall \alpha,\beta \in \mathbb{N}^N$$
by definition different monomials are orthogonal, so that
$$\langle X^\alpha | X^\beta \rangle = 0$$
if $\alpha \neq \beta,$

while
$$\forall \alpha \in \mathbb{N}^N$$
by definition
$$\|X^\alpha\|^2 = \frac{\alpha!}{|\alpha|!}.$$

In the above definition and in the rest of this article the following notation applies:

if
$$\alpha = (\alpha_1,\dots,\alpha_N) \in \mathbb{N}^N,$$
write
$$|\alpha| = \sum_{i=1}^N \alpha_i$$
and
$$\alpha! = \prod_{i=1}^N (\alpha_i!)$$
and
$$X^\alpha = \prod_{i=1}^N X_i^{\alpha_i}.$$

== Bombieri inequality ==
The fundamental property of this norm is the Bombieri inequality:

let $P,Q$ be two homogeneous polynomials respectively of degree $d^\circ(P)$ and $d^\circ(Q)$ with $N$ variables, then, the following inequality holds:

$$\frac{d^\circ(P)!d^\circ(Q)!}{(d^\circ(P)+d^\circ(Q))!}\|P\|^2 \, \|Q\|^2 \leq
\|P\cdot Q\|^2 \leq \|P\|^2 \, \|Q\|^2.$$

Here the Bombieri inequality is the left hand side of the above statement, while the right side means that the Bombieri norm is an algebra norm. Giving the left hand side is meaningless without that constraint, because in this case, we can achieve the same result with any norm by multiplying the norm by a well chosen factor.

This multiplicative inequality implies that the product of two polynomials is bounded from below by a quantity that depends on the multiplicand polynomials. Thus, this product can not be arbitrarily small. This multiplicative inequality is useful in metric algebraic geometry and number theory.

== Invariance by isometry ==
Another important property is that the Bombieri norm is invariant by composition with an isometry:

let $P,Q$ be two homogeneous polynomials of degree $d$ with $N$ variables and let $h$ be an isometry of $\mathbb R^N$ (or $\mathbb C^N$). Then we have $\langle P\circ h|Q\circ h\rangle = \langle P|Q\rangle$. When $P=Q$ this implies $\|P\circ h\|=\|P\|$.

This result follows from a nice integral formulation of the scalar product:

$$\langle P|Q\rangle = {d+N-1 \choose N-1} \int_{S^N} P(Z)\overline{Q(Z)}\,d\sigma(Z)$$

where $S^N$ is the unit sphere of $\mathbb C^N$ with its canonical measure $d\sigma(Z)$.

== Other inequalities ==
Let $P$ be a homogeneous polynomial of degree $d$ with $N$ variables and let $Z \in \mathbb C^N$. We have:

- $|P(Z)| \leq \|P\| \, \|Z\|_E^d$
- $\|\nabla P(Z)\|_E \leq d \|P\| \, \|Z\|_E^d$

where $\|\cdot\|_E$ denotes the Euclidean norm.

The Bombieri norm is useful in polynomial factorization, where it has some advantages over the Mahler measure, according to Knuth.

== See also ==
- Grassmann manifold
- Hardy space
- Homogeneous polynomial
- Plücker embedding
