= Stanisław Mazur =

Polish mathematician (1905–1981)

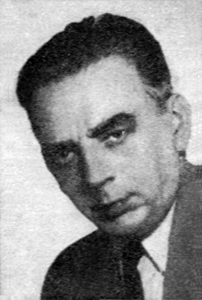
- Stanisław Mazur in 1966
- Born: 1 January 1905; Lwów, Galicia and Lodomeria, Austria-Hungary (now Lviv, Ukraine)
- Died: 5 November 1981 (aged 76); Warsaw, Poland
- Education: University of Lviv
- Known for: approximation property Banach–Mazur theorem Banach–Mazur game Banach-Mazur compactum Gelfand–Mazur theorem Mazur–Ulam theorem Mazur's lemma Mazur-Orlicz theorem Ascoli-Mazur theorem
- Awards: Stefan Banach Prize (1949)
- Scientific career
- Fields: Mathematics
- Workplaces: University of Lviv; University of Łódź; University of Warsaw
- Thesis: O szeregach warunkowo sumowalnych (1932)
- Doctoral advisor: Stefan Banach
- Doctoral students: Aleksander Pełczyński; Wiesław Żelazko

Stanisław Mieczysław Mazur (Polish: [ˈmazur]; 1 January 1905 – 5 November 1981) was a Polish mathematician, a member of the Polish Academy of Sciences and one of the leading representatives of the Lwów School of Mathematics

Mazur made important contributions to geometrical methods in linear and nonlinear functional analysis and to the study of Banach algebras. He was also interested in summability theory, infinite games and computable functions.

== Life and career ==
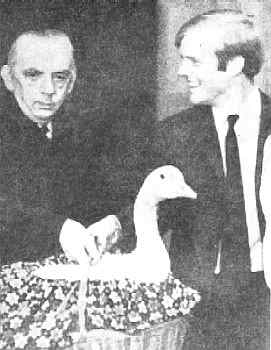
Mazur awards a live goose to Per Enflo, who solved Mazur's 1936 problem in the Scottish book. The photograph comes from the book Pół wieku matematyki polskiej 1920-1970 ("Half a Century of Polish Mathematics 1920-1970").

Mazur was born on 1 January 1905 in Lwów, then part of the Kingdom of Galicia and Lodomeria within Austria-Hungary, to Tomasz Mazur and Aniela (née Zawrotniak). In 1923, he graduated from a gymnasium in Lwów. Between 1923–1926, Mazur studied at the Jan Kazimierz University (now the University of Lviv). In 1925, he completed an internship at the Sorbonne in Paris.

Mazur was a student of Stefan Banach at Jan Kazimierz University. His doctorate entitled O szeregach warunkowo sumowalnych (On Conditionally Summable Series), under Banach's supervision, was awarded in 1932. Mazur, with Juliusz Schauder, was an Invited Speaker at the International Congress of Mathematicians in 1936 in Oslo. In 1936, he earned his habilitation and in 1947, he became a professor at the University of Łódź and the following year at the University of Warsaw.

Mazur was a close collaborator with Banach at Lwów and was a member of the Lwów School of Mathematics, where he participated in the mathematical activities at the Scottish Café. He was the author or co-author of 47 problems included in the Scottish Book. On 6 November 1936, he posed the "basis problem" of determining whether every Banach space has a Schauder basis, with Mazur promising a "live goose" as a reward: 37 years later and in a ceremony that was broadcast throughout Poland, Mazur awarded a live goose to Per Enflo for constructing a counter-example.

In 1939, he became a deputy to the People’s Assembly of Western Ukraine; from 1940 he served as a councillor on the Lviv City Council, and after the Soviets returned in 1944 he joined the Main Board of the Union of Polish Patriots.

In 1946, Mazur was awarded the Officer's Cross of the Order of Polonia Restituta. From 1948 Mazur worked at the University of Warsaw. He also worked at the State Institute of Mathematics, which was incorporated into the Polish Academy of Sciences in 1952. He was a foreign member of the Hungarian Academy of Sciences. In 1949, he received the Stefan Banach Prize conferred by the Polish Mathematical Society.

In 1978, he was awarded an honorary life membership in the Polish Mathematical Society and in 1980, an honorary doctorate at the University of Warsaw. His notable doctoral students included Aleksander Pełczyński and Wiesław Żelazko.

== See also ==
- List of Polish mathematicians
- Approximation problem
- Compact operator
- Schauder basis
