= Herman Auerbach =

Polish mathematician

Herman Auerbach (October 26, 1901, Tarnopol – August 17, 1942) was a Polish mathematician and member of the Lwów School of Mathematics.

Auerbach was professor at Lwów University. He is known for introducing the Auerbach's lemma, a theorem in functional analysis. During the Second World War, because of his Jewish descent, he was imprisoned by the Germans in the Lwów Ghetto. In 1942, he was murdered at Bełżec extermination camp.

== See also ==
- Jewish ghettos in German-occupied Poland
- List of Nazi-German concentration camps
- The Holocaust in Poland
- World War II casualties of Poland
