= Approximation property =

Mathematical concept

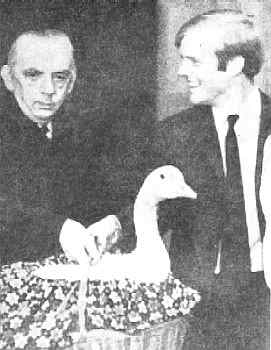
The construction of a Banach space without the approximation property earned Per Enflo a live goose in 1972, which had been promised by Stanisław Mazur (left) in 1936.

In mathematics, specifically functional analysis, a Banach space is said to have the approximation property (AP) if every compact operator is a limit of finite-rank operators. The converse is always true.

Every Hilbert space has this property. There are, however, Banach spaces which do not; Per Enflo published the first counterexample in a 1973 article. However, much work in this area was done by Grothendieck (1955).

Later many other counterexamples were found. The space $\mathcal L(H)$ of bounded operators on an infinite-dimensional Hilbert space $H$ does not have the approximation property. The spaces $\ell^p$ for $p\neq 2$ and $c_0$ (see Sequence space) have closed subspaces that do not have the approximation property.

== Definition ==
A locally convex topological vector space X is said to have the approximation property, if the identity map can be approximated, uniformly on precompact sets, by continuous linear maps of finite rank.

For a locally convex space X, the following are equivalent:

1. X has the approximation property;
2. the closure of $X^{\prime} \otimes X$ in $\operatorname{L}_p(X, X)$ contains the identity map $\operatorname{Id} : X \to X$;
3. $X^{\prime} \otimes X$ is dense in $\operatorname{L}_p(X, X)$;
4. for every locally convex space Y, $X^{\prime} \otimes Y$ is dense in $\operatorname{L}_p(X, Y)$;
5. for every locally convex space Y, $Y^{\prime} \otimes X$ is dense in $\operatorname{L}_p(Y, X)$;

where $\operatorname{L}_p(X, Y)$ denotes the space of continuous linear operators from X to Y endowed with the topology of uniform convergence on pre-compact subsets of X.

If X is a Banach space this requirement becomes that for every compact set $K\subset X$ and every $\varepsilon>0$, there is an operator $T\colon X\to X$ of finite rank so that $\|Tx-x\|\leq\varepsilon$, for every $x \in K$.

== Related definitions ==
Some other flavours of the AP are studied:

Let $X$ be a Banach space and let $1\leq\lambda<\infty$. We say that X has the $\lambda$-approximation property ($\lambda$-AP), if, for every compact set $K\subset X$ and every $\varepsilon>0$, there is an operator $T\colon X \to X$ of finite rank so that $\|Tx - x\|\leq\varepsilon$, for every $x \in K$, and $\|T\|\leq\lambda$.

A Banach space is said to have bounded approximation property (BAP), if it has the $\lambda$-AP for some $\lambda$.

A Banach space is said to have metric approximation property (MAP), if it is 1-AP.

A Banach space is said to have compact approximation property (CAP), if in the definition of AP an operator of finite rank is replaced with a compact operator.

== Examples ==
- Every subspace of an arbitrary product of Hilbert spaces possesses the approximation property. In particular,
  - every Hilbert space has the approximation property.
  - every projective limit of Hilbert spaces, as well as any subspace of such a projective limit, possesses the approximation property.
  - every nuclear space possesses the approximation property.
- Every separable Fréchet space that contains a Schauder basis possesses the approximation property.
- Every space with a Schauder basis has the AP (we can use the projections associated to the base as the $T$'s in the definition), thus many spaces with the AP can be found. For example, the $\ell^p$ spaces, or the symmetric Tsirelson space.

== Bibliography ==
- Bartle, R. G. (1977). "MR0402468 (53 #6288) (Review of Per Enflo's "A counterexample to the approximation problem in Banach spaces" Acta Mathematica 130 (1973), 309–317)". Mathematical Reviews. MR 0402468.
- Enflo, P.: A counterexample to the approximation property in Banach spaces. Acta Math. 130, 309–317(1973).
- Grothendieck, A.: Produits tensoriels topologiques et espaces nucleaires. Memo. Amer. Math. Soc. 16 (1955).
- Halmos, Paul R. (1978). "Schauder bases". American Mathematical Monthly. 85 (4): 256–257. doi:10.2307/2321165. JSTOR 2321165. MR 0488901.
- Paul R. Halmos, "Has progress in mathematics slowed down?" Amer. Math. Monthly 97 (1990), no. 7, 561–588. MR 1066321
- William B. Johnson "Complementably universal separable Banach spaces" in Robert G. Bartle (ed.), 1980 Studies in functional analysis, Mathematical Association of America.
- Kwapień, S. "On Enflo's example of a Banach space without the approximation property". Séminaire Goulaouic–Schwartz 1972—1973: Équations aux dérivées partielles et analyse fonctionnelle, Exp. No. 8, 9 pp. Centre de Math., École Polytech., Paris, 1973. MR 0407569
- Lindenstrauss, J.; Tzafriri, L.: Classical Banach Spaces I, Sequence spaces, 1977.
- Nedevski, P.; Trojanski, S. (1973). "P. Enflo solved in the negative Banach's problem on the existence of a basis for every separable Banach space". Fiz.-Mat. Spis. Bulgar. Akad. Nauk. 16 (49): 134–138. MR 0458132.
- Pietsch, Albrecht (2007). History of Banach spaces and linear operators. Boston, MA: Birkhäuser Boston, Inc. pp. xxiv+855 pp. ISBN 978-0-8176-4367-6. MR 2300779.
- Karen Saxe, Beginning Functional Analysis, Undergraduate Texts in Mathematics, 2002 Springer-Verlag, New York.
- Schaefer, Helmut H.; Wolff, M.P. (1999). Topological Vector Spaces. GTM. Vol. 3. New York: Springer-Verlag. ISBN 9780387987262.
- Singer, Ivan. Bases in Banach spaces. II. Editura Academiei Republicii Socialiste România, Bucharest; Springer-Verlag, Berlin-New York, 1981. viii+880 pp. ISBN 3-540-10394-5. MR 0610799
