= Stefan Banach =

Polish mathematician (1892–1945)

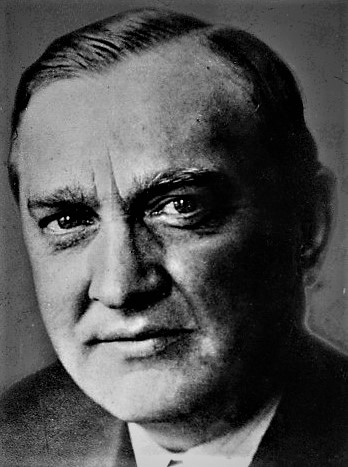
- Born: 30 March 1892; Kraków, Austria-Hungary (today Poland)
- Died: 31 August 1945 (aged 53); Lviv, Ukrainian SSR, Soviet Union (today Ukraine)
- Education: Technical University of Lwów
- Known for: Banach space Functional analysis Banach algebra Banach measure Banach–Tarski paradox Banach fixed-point theorem Banach–Steinhaus theorem Banach–Mazur theorem Banach–Schauder theorem Hahn–Banach theorem Banach–Alaoglu theorem Banach–Stone theorem Banach manifold Banach bundle Surjection of Fréchet spaces
- Awards: Membership: Polish Academy of Learning
- Scientific career
- Fields: Mathematics
- Workplaces: University of Lwów
- Doctoral advisors: Hugo Steinhaus; Kazimierz Twardowski
- Doctoral students: Stanisław Mazur
- Other notable students: Józef Schreier; Stanislaw Ulam

Stefan Banach (Polish: [ˈstɛfan ˈbanax]; 30 March 1892 – 31 August 1945) was a Polish mathematician who is generally considered one of the 20th century's most important and influential mathematicians. He was one of the founders of modern functional analysis, and an original member of the Lwów School of Mathematics. His major work was the 1932 book, Théorie des opérations linéaires (Theory of Linear Operations), the first monograph on the general theory of functional analysis.

Born in Kraków to a family of Goral descent, Banach showed a keen interest in mathematics and engaged in solving mathematical problems during school recess. After completing his secondary education, he befriended Hugo Steinhaus, with whom he established the Polish Mathematical Society in 1919 and later published the scientific journal Studia Mathematica. In 1920, he received an assistantship at the Lwów Polytechnic, subsequently becoming a professor in 1922 and a member of the Polish Academy of Learning in 1924. Banach was also a co-founder of the Lwów School of Mathematics, a school of thought comprising some of the most renowned Polish mathematicians of the interwar period (1918–1939).

Some of the most notable mathematical concepts that bear Banach's name include Banach spaces, Banach algebras, Banach measures, the Banach–Tarski paradox, the Hahn–Banach theorem, the Banach–Steinhaus theorem, the Banach–Mazur game, the Banach–Alaoglu theorem, Banach-Saks property, and the Banach fixed-point theorem.

== Life ==
=== Early life ===
Stefan Banach was born on 30 March 1892 at St. Lazarus General Hospital in Kraków, then part of the Austro-Hungarian Empire, into a Góral Roman Catholic family, and was subsequently baptised by his father. Banach's parents were Stefan Greczek and Katarzyna Banach, both natives of the Podhale region. Greczek was a soldier in the Austro-Hungarian Army stationed in Kraków. Little is known about Banach's mother. According to his baptismal certificate, she was born in Borówna and worked as a domestic helper.

Unusually, Stefan's surname was his mother's instead of his father's, though he received his father's given name, Stefan. Military regulations did not permit soldiers of Stefan Greczek's rank to marry; he was a private and as the mother was too poor to support the child, the couple decided that he should be reared by family and friends. Stefan spent the first few years of his life with his grandmother, but when she was taken ill, Greczek arranged for his son to be raised by Franciszka Płowa and her niece Maria Puchalska in Kraków. Young Stefan came to regard Franciszka as his foster mother and Maria as his older sister. In his early years Banach was tutored by Juliusz Mien, a French intellectual and friend of the Płowa family, who had emigrated to Poland and supported himself with photography and translations of Polish literature into French. Mien taught Banach French and most likely encouraged him in his early mathematical pursuits.

In 1902, Banach, aged 10, enrolled in Kraków's IV Gymnasium (the predecessor of Jan III Sobieski High School). While the school specialized in the humanities, Banach and his best friend Witold Wiłkosz (also a future mathematician) spent most of their time working on mathematics problems during breaks and after school. Later in life Banach credited Dr. Kamil Kraft, the mathematics and physics teacher at the school, with kindling his interests in mathematics. While Banach was a diligent student he did, on occasion, receive low grades (he failed Greek during his first semester at the school) and later spoke critically of the school's math teachers.

After obtaining his matura (high school diploma) at age 18 in 1910, Banach moved to Lwów (today called Lviv) with the intention of studying at the Lwów Polytechnic. He initially chose engineering as his field of study since at the time he was convinced that there was nothing new to discover in mathematics. At some point he also attended Jagiellonian University in Kraków on a part-time basis. As Banach had to earn money to support his studies it was not until 1914 that he finally, at age 22, passed his high school graduation exams.

When World War I broke out, Banach was excused from military service due to his left-handedness and poor vision. When the Russian Army opened its offensive toward Lwów, Banach left for Kraków, where he spent the rest of the war. He made his living as a tutor at the local schools, worked in a bookstore and as a foreman of a road building crew. He attended some lectures at the Jagiellonian University at that time, including those of the famous Polish mathematicians Stanisław Zaremba and Kazimierz Żorawski, but little is known of that period of his life.

=== Discovery by Steinhaus ===
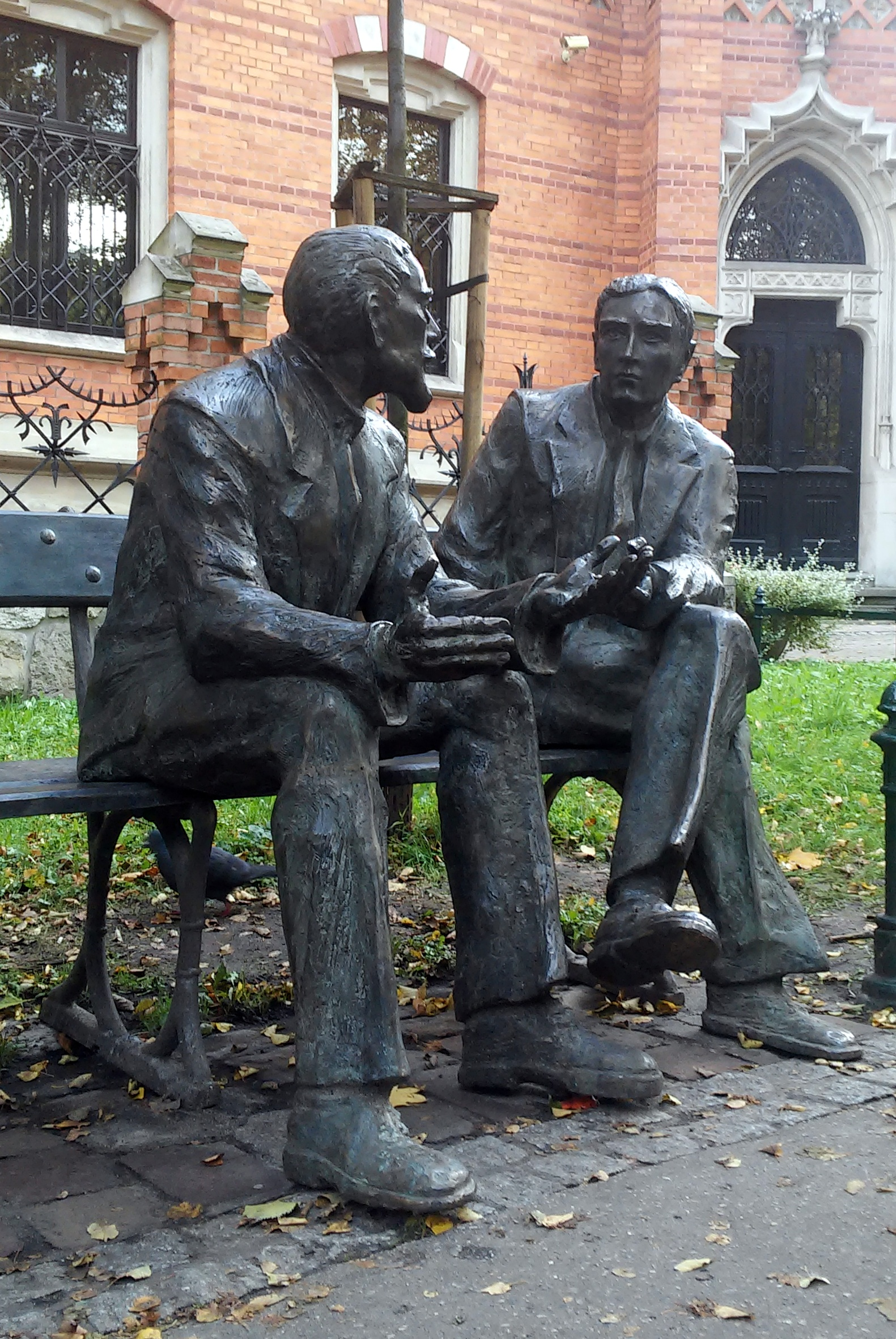
Otto Nikodym and Stefan Banach Memorial Bench in Kraków, Poland (sculpted by Stefan Dousa)

In 1916, in Kraków's Planty park, Banach encountered Professor Hugo Steinhaus, one of the renowned mathematicians of the time. According to Steinhaus, while he was strolling through the gardens he was surprised to overhear the term "Lebesgue integral" (Lebesgue integration was at the time still a fairly new idea in mathematics) and walked over to investigate. As a result, he met Banach, as well as Otto Nikodym. Steinhaus became fascinated with the self-taught young mathematician. The encounter resulted in a long-lasting collaboration and friendship. In fact, soon after the encounter Steinhaus invited Banach to solve some problems he had been working on but which had proven difficult. Banach solved them within a week and the two soon published their first joint work (On the Mean Convergence of Fourier Series). Steinhaus, Banach and Nikodym, along with several other Kraków mathematicians (Władysław Ślebodziński, Leon Chwistek, Alfred Rosenblatt and Włodzimierz Stożek) also established a mathematical society, which eventually became the Polish Mathematical Society. The society was officially founded on 2 April 1919. It was also through Steinhaus that Banach met his future wife, Łucja Braus.

=== Interbellum ===
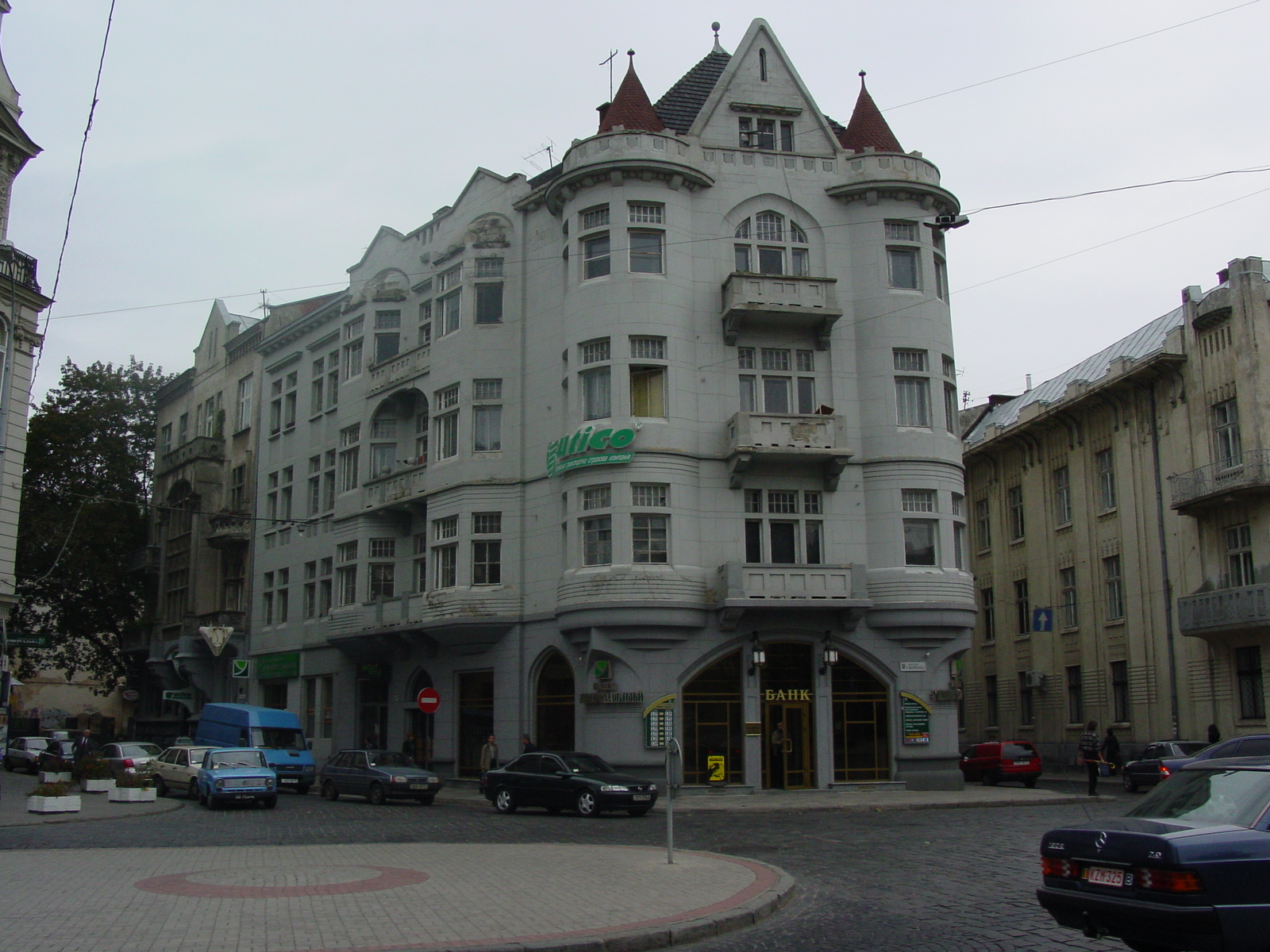
Scottish Café, meeting place of many famous Lwów mathematicians

Steinhaus introduced Banach to academic circles and substantially accelerated his career. After Poland regained independence in 1918, Banach was given an assistantship at the Lwów Polytechnic. Steinhaus' backing also allowed him to receive a doctorate without actually graduating from a university. The doctoral thesis, accepted by King John II Casimir University of Lwów in 1920 and published in 1922, included the basic ideas of functional analysis, which was soon to become an entirely new branch of mathematics. In his dissertation, written in 1920, he axiomatically defined what is today called a Banach space. The thesis was widely discussed in academic circles and allowed him in 1922 to become a professor at the Lwów Polytechnic. Initially an assistant to Professor Antoni Łomnicki, in 1927, Banach received his own chair. In 1924 he was accepted as a member of the Polish Academy of Learning. At the same time, from 1922, Banach also headed the second Chair of Mathematics at University of Lwów.

Young and talented, Banach gathered around him a large group of mathematicians. The group, meeting in the Scottish Café, soon gave birth to the "Lwów School of Mathematics". In 1929 the group began publishing its own journal, Studia Mathematica, devoted primarily to Banach's field of study—functional analysis. Around that time, Banach also began working on his best-known work, the first monograph on the general theory of linear-metric space. First published in Polish in 1931, the next year it was also translated into French and gained wider recognition in European academic circles. The book was also the first in a long series of mathematics monographs edited by Banach and his circle. On 17 June 1924, Banach became a correspondence member of the Polish Academy of Sciences and Fine Arts in Kraków.

=== World War II ===
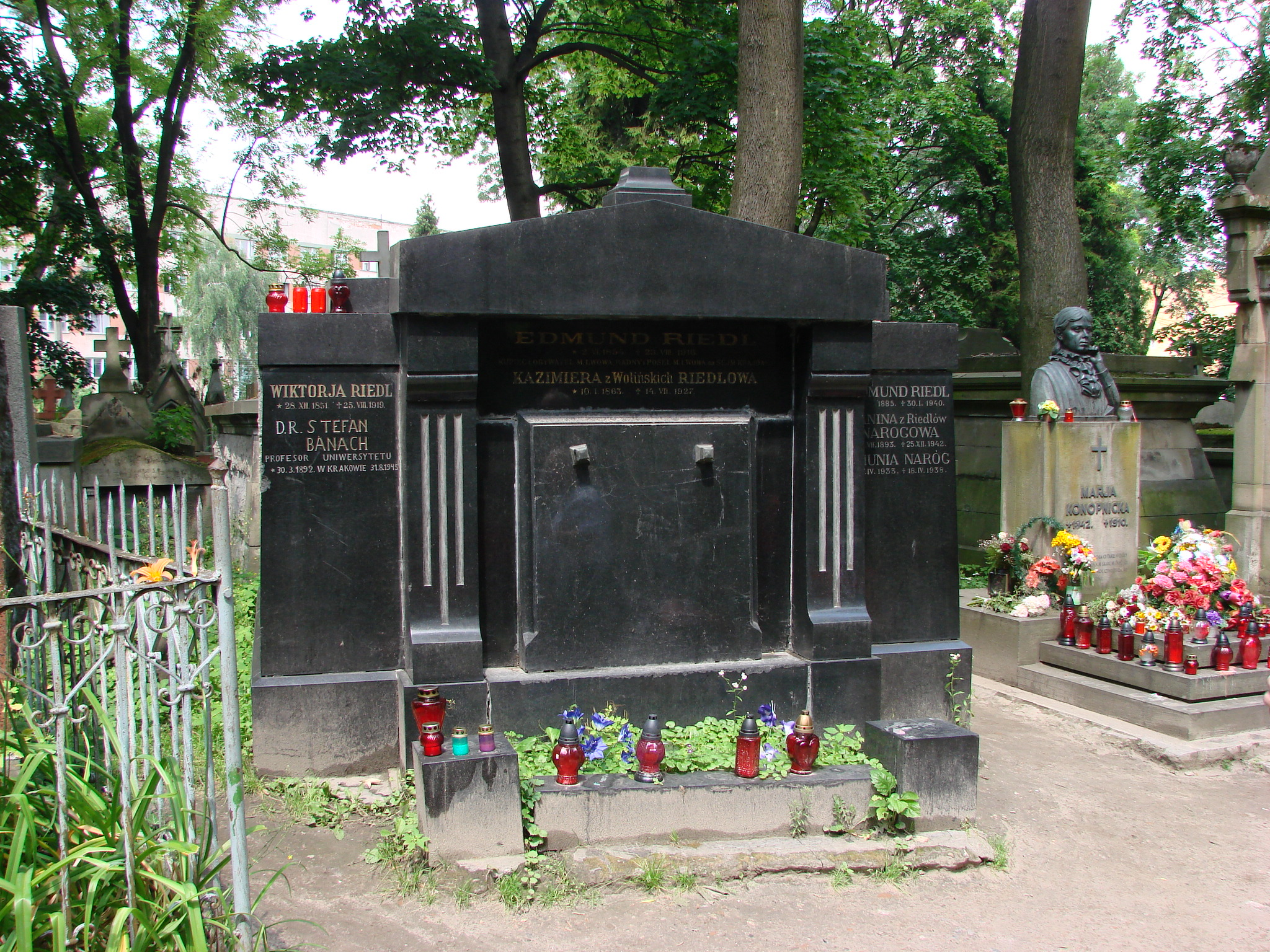
Banach's grave, Lychakiv Cemetery, Lviv (Lwów, in Polish)

After the invasion of Poland by Nazi Germany and the Soviet Union, Lwów came under the control of the Soviet Union for almost two years. Banach, from 1939 a corresponding member of the Academy of Sciences of Ukraine, and on good terms with Soviet mathematicians, had to promise to learn Ukrainian to be allowed to keep his chair and continue his academic activities. In 1940 he was appointed by the Soviets as a member of the Lviv City Council. After the German takeover of Lwów in 1941 during Operation Barbarossa, all universities were closed and Banach, along with many colleagues and his son, was employed as a lice feeder at Professor Rudolf Weigl's Typhus Research Institute. Employment in Weigl's Institute provided many unemployed university professors and their associates protection from random arrest and deportation to Nazi concentration camps.

After the Soviet Red Army recaptured Lviv in the Lvov–Sandomierz Offensive of 1944, Banach returned to the university and helped re-establish it after the war years. However, because the Soviets were deporting Poles from annexed formerly Polish eastern territories, Banach began preparing to leave the city and settle in Kraków, Poland, where he had been promised a chair at the Jagiellonian University. He was also considered a candidate for Minister of Education of Poland. In January 1945, however, he was diagnosed with lung cancer and was permitted to stay in Lwów. He died on 31 August 1945, aged 53. His funeral at the Lychakiv Cemetery (Cmentarz Łyczakowski) was attended by hundreds of people. His chair at Lwow was subsequently taken up by Wladimir Lewicki.

== Contributions ==
Banach's dissertation, completed in 1920 and published in 1922, formally axiomatized the concept of a complete normed vector space and laid the foundations for the area of functional analysis. In this work Banach called such spaces "class E-spaces", but in his 1932 book, Théorie des opérations linéaires, he changed terminology and referred to them as "spaces of type B", which most likely contributed to the subsequent eponymous naming of these spaces after him. The theory of what came to be known as Banach spaces had antecedents in the work of the Hungarian mathematician Frigyes Riesz (published in 1916) and contemporaneous contributions from Hans Hahn and Norbert Wiener. For a brief period in fact, complete normed linear spaces were referred to as "Banach–Wiener" spaces in mathematical literature, based on terminology introduced by Wiener himself. However, because Wiener's work on the topic was limited, the established name became just Banach spaces.

Likewise, Banach's fixed point theorem, based on earlier methods developed by Charles Émile Picard, was included in his dissertation, and was later extended by his students (for example in the Banach–Schauder theorem) and other mathematicians (in particular Brouwer and Poincaré and Birkhoff). The theorem did not require linearity of the space, and applied to any complete Cauchy space (in particular to any complete metric space).

Decomposition of a ball into two identical balls – the Banach–Tarski paradox

The Hahn–Banach theorem is one of the fundamental theorems of functional analysis. Further theorems related to Banach are:

- Banach–Tarski paradox
- Banach–Steinhaus theorem
- Banach–Alaoglu theorem
- Banach–Stone theorem

== Recognition ==
In 1946, the Stefan Banach Prize (Polish: Nagroda im. Stefana Banacha) was established by the Polish Mathematical Society. In 1982, the Polish Post issued a 15-zloty commemorative stamp featuring Banach as part of the "Polish Mathematicians" series.

In 1992, the Institute of Mathematics of the Polish Academy of Sciences established a special Stefan Banach Medal for outstanding achievements in mathematical sciences. Since 2009, the International Stefan Banach Prize has been conferred by the Polish Mathematical Society to mathematicians for best doctoral dissertations in the mathematical sciences with the objective to "promote and financially support the most promising young researchers".

Stefan Banach is the patron of a number of schools and streets including in Warsaw, Lviv, Wrocław, Zabrze, Łódź, Świdnica, Toruń and Jarosław.

In 2001, a minor planet 16856 Banach, discovered by Paul Comba in 1997, was named after him.

In 2012, the National Bank of Poland celebrated the mathematician's achievements by issuing a series of commemorative coins designed by Robert Kotowicz (golden 200-zloty coin, silver 10-zloty coin and Nordic Gold 2-zloty coin).

In 2016, a commemorative bench featuring Banach and Otto Nikodym was unveiled in Kraków's Planty Park on the 100th anniversary of the conversation the two mathematicians held when they first met Hugo Steinhaus, which proved instrumental in the development of his scientific career.

In 2018, at a ceremony held at the Royal Castle in Warsaw on the 100th anniversary of Poland regaining its independence, Polish President Andrzej Duda posthumously conferred the country's highest distinction, the Order of the White Eagle, upon 25 distinguished Poles including Banach.

In 2019, Polish entomologist Marcin Kamiński named a newly discovered species of South African darkling beetle, Machleida banachi, in honor of the mathematician Stefan Banach and his contributions to science.

In 2021, one of the episodes of Polish documentary TV series Geniusze i marzyciele (Geniuses and Dreamers) aired on TVP1 and TVP Dokument channels was devoted to Stefan Banach.

In 2022, Google Doodle commemorated the 100th anniversary of Banach receiving his title of professor.

== Quotes ==
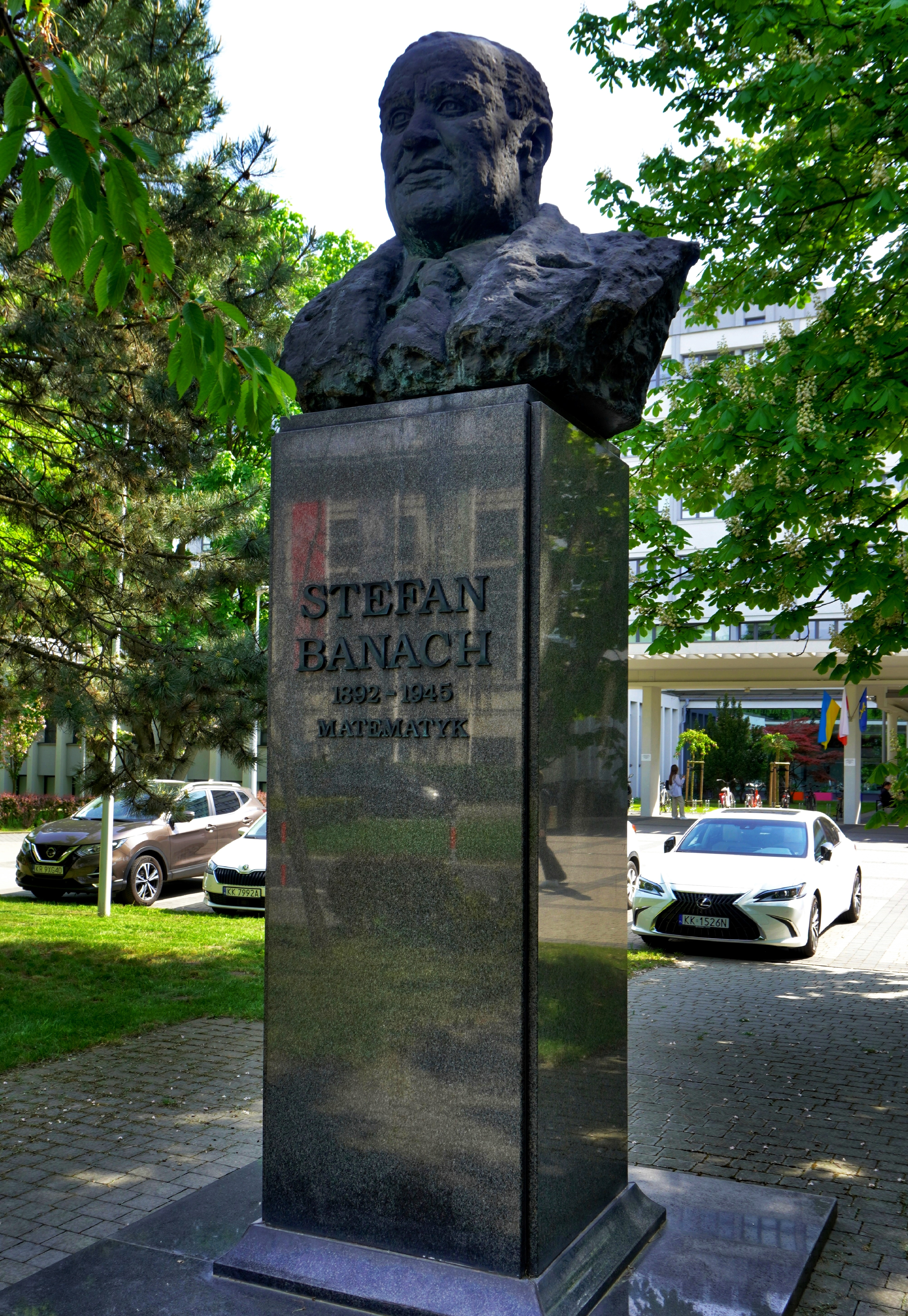
Banach monument, Kraków

Stanislaw Ulam, another mathematician of the Lwów School of Mathematics, in his autobiography, quotes Banach as saying:

"Good mathematicians see analogies between theorems or theories, the very best ones see analogies between analogies."

Hugo Steinhaus said of Banach:

"Banach was my greatest scientific discovery."

== See also ==
- Closed range theorem
- International Stefan Banach Prize
- List of Poles
- List of Polish mathematicians
- List of things named after Stefan Banach
- Timeline of Polish science and technology
