= Tadeusz Figiel =

Polish mathematician (1948–2025)

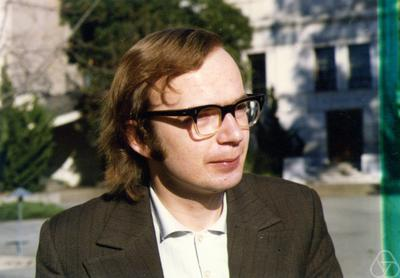
- Born: 2 July 1948; Gdańsk, Poland
- Died: 8 September 2025 (aged 77); Gdańsk, Poland
- Education: University of Warsaw
- Scientific career
- Fields: Mathematics (Functional Analysis)
- Doctoral advisor: Aleksander Pełczyński
- Doctoral students: Andrzej Borzyszkowski

Tadeusz Figiel (2 July 1948 – 8 September 2025) was a Polish mathematician specializing in functional analysis.

== Biography ==
In 1970 Figiel graduated in mathematics at the University of Warsaw. He received his doctorate in 1972 under the supervision of Aleksander Pełczyński and then habilitated in 1975 with habilitation thesis O modułach wypukłości i gładkości (On modules of convexity and smoothness) at the Instytut Matematyczny Polskiej Academia Nauk (Instytut Matematyczny PAN). There Figiel was appointed in 1983 an associate professor and in 1990 a full professor. He is the head of the Gdańsk Branch of the Polish Academy of Sciences and the editor-in-chief of the journal Studia Mathematica.

Figiel received in 1976 the Stefan Banach Award, in 1988 the Polish State Award of First Degree (together with Zbigniew Ciesielski), in 1989 the Medal of the National Education Committee, and in 2004 the Stefan Banach Medal. In 1983 he was an Invited Speaker at the International Congress of Mathematicians in Warsaw.

== Selected publications ==
- Figiel, T.; Johnson, W. B. (1973). "The approximation property does not imply the bounded approximation". Proceedings of the American Mathematical Society. 41 (1): 197–200. doi:10.1090/S0002-9939-1973-0341032-5.
- Davis, W. J.; Figiel, T.; Johnson, W. B.; Pelczynski, A. (1974). "Factoring weakly compact operators" (PDF). Journal of Functional Analysis. 17 (3): 311–327. doi:10.1016/0022-1236(74)90044-5.
- Figiel, T.; Johnson, W. B. (1974). "A uniformly convex Banach space which contains no l_{p}". Compositio Mathematica. 29 (2): 179–190.
- Figiel, T.; Johnson, W. B.; Tzafriri, L. (1975). "On Banach lattices and spaces having local unconditional structure, with applications to Lorentz function spaces" (PDF). Journal of Approximation Theory. 13 (4): 395–412. doi:10.1016/0021-9045(75)90023-4.
- Figiel, T. (1976). "On the moduli of convexity and smoothness". Studia Mathematica. 56 (2): 121–155. doi:10.4064/sm-56-2-121-155.
- Figiel, T.; Lindenstrauss, J.; Milman, V. D. (1977). "The dimension of almost spherical sections of convex bodies". Acta Mathematica. 139 (1): 53–94. doi:10.1007/BF02392234.
- Ciesielski, Z.; Figiel, T. (1983). "Spline bases in classical function spaces on compact C^{∞} manifolds, Part II". Studia Mathematica. 76 (2): 95–136. doi:10.4064/sm-76-2-95-136.
- Figiel, T. (1990). "Singular integral operators: a martingale approach". Geometry of Banach spaces (Strobl, 1989). London Mathematical Society Lecture Note series. Vol. 158. pp. 95–110. doi:10.1017/CBO9780511662317.010.
- Dykema, Ken; Figiel, Tadeusz; Weiss, Gary; Wodzicki, Mariusz (2004). "Commutator structure of operator ideals" (PDF). Advances in Mathematics. 185 (1): 1–79. doi:10.1016/S0001-8708(03)00141-5.
