= Świątek =

Świątek (pronounced [ˈɕfjɔntɛk]) is a Polish surname. The most common respelling outside Poland is Swiontek, reflecting pronunciation. Other respellings include Swiantek, Swiatek, and Schwiontek.

Notable people with the surname include:

== People ==
=== Świątek ===
- Adela Świątek (1945–2019), Polish mathematician
- Adrian Świątek (born 1986), Polish footballer
- Andrzej Świątek (born 1958), Polish ice hockey player
- Grzegorz Świątek (born 1964), Polish mathematician
- Iga Świątek (born 2001), Polish tennis player
- Kazimierz Świątek (1914–2011), Polish Roman Catholic cardinal
- Roman Świątek (Roman Świątkiewicz, born 1928), Polish writer
- Tadeusz Świątek (born 1961), Polish footballer
- Taryn Swiatek (born 1981), Canadian soccer goalkeeper
- Tomasz Świątek (born 1964), Polish rower
- Władysław Świątek (1897–1930), Polish sports shooter

=== Swiontek ===
- Steve Swiontek (born 1954), American politician
