= Ligocki =

Ligocki (feminine Ligocka) is a Polish surname. The "Dictionary of American Family Names" describes the origin as:

Habitational name for someone from any of numerous places in Poland called Ligota, denoting a settlement that was exempt from paying tribute.

It may refer to:

- Ewa Ligocka (1947–2022), Polish mathematician
- Mateusz Ligocki (born 1982), Polish snowboarder
- Michał Ligocki (born 1985), Polish snowboarder
- Paulina Ligocka (born 1984), Polish snowboarder
- Roma Ligocka (born 1938), Polish costume designer
