= Ewa Ligocka =

Polish mathematician and political activist (1947–2022)

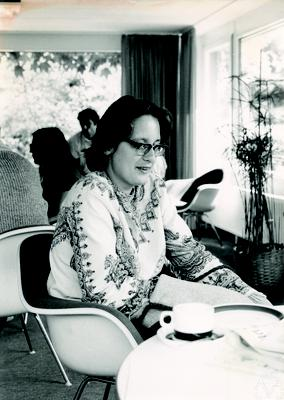
- Born: 13 October 1947; Katowice, Polish People's Republic
- Died: 28 October 2022 (aged 75)
- Occupation: Mathematician
- Awards: Stanisław Zaremba Grand Prize of the Polish Mathematical Society; Stefan Bergman Prize

Academic background
- Education: University of Warsaw
- Doctoral advisor: Wiesław Żelazko

Academic work
- Discipline: Complex analysis
- Institutions: University of Warsaw; Institute of Mathematics of the Polish Academy of Sciences
- Main interests: Analytic functions on topological vector spaces Bergman kernel Feferman–Vaught theorem

Ewa Ligocka (13 October 1947 – 28 October 2022) was a Polish mathematician specializing in complex analysis, and also a political activist.

== Early life and education ==
Ligocka was born in Katowice on 13 October 1947, the daughter of Polish photography critic and historian Alfred Ligocki. As a high school student under the tutelage of Teodor Paliczka, she competed for Poland in the International Mathematical Olympiad in 1965.

Ligocka earned a master's degree at the University of Warsaw in 1970 and completed a Ph.D. there in 1973 under the supervision of Wiesław Żelazko. During this period, her research concerned the theory of analytic functions on topological vector spaces. In 1972, she reportedly plucked and cooked the goose given to Per Enflo as the prize for solving Mazur's goose problem.

== Career and later life ==
After completing her doctorate, Ligocka continued as a researcher at the University of Warsaw. As an assistant professor in 1976, she signed an open letter regarding the June 1976 Polish protests in Radom and Ursus. Despite the efforts of other mathematicians to protect her, this act of protest led to her transfer to a branch campus of the university in Białystok, and then to her dismissal from the university in 1977.

Meanwhile, Ligocka had begun working with Maciej Skwarczyński on the Bergman kernel. By 1978, she began her research with MIT student Steven R. Bell on the Feferman–Vaught theorem on the smooth extension of biholomorphisms to the boundaries of their domains. This work, which was published in Inventiones Mathematicae in 1980, had already created a stir in Polish mathematics in the late 1970s, and in 1979 she was hired by Czesław Olech as a researcher at the Institute of Mathematics of the Polish Academy of Sciences without any political restrictions.

Ligocka completed a habilitation in 1986, and in 1992 returned to the University of Warsaw as an associate professor. She was given the degree of professor in 1994. She retired in 2008, and died on 28 October 2022.

== Recognition ==
Ligocka was the 1986 recipient of the Stanisław Zaremba Grand Prize of the Polish Mathematical Society. She and Steven R. Bell received the 1991 Stefan Bergman Prize of the American Mathematical Society for their work on the Feferman–Vaught theorem.
