= Urszula Alicja Foryś =

Polish mathematician

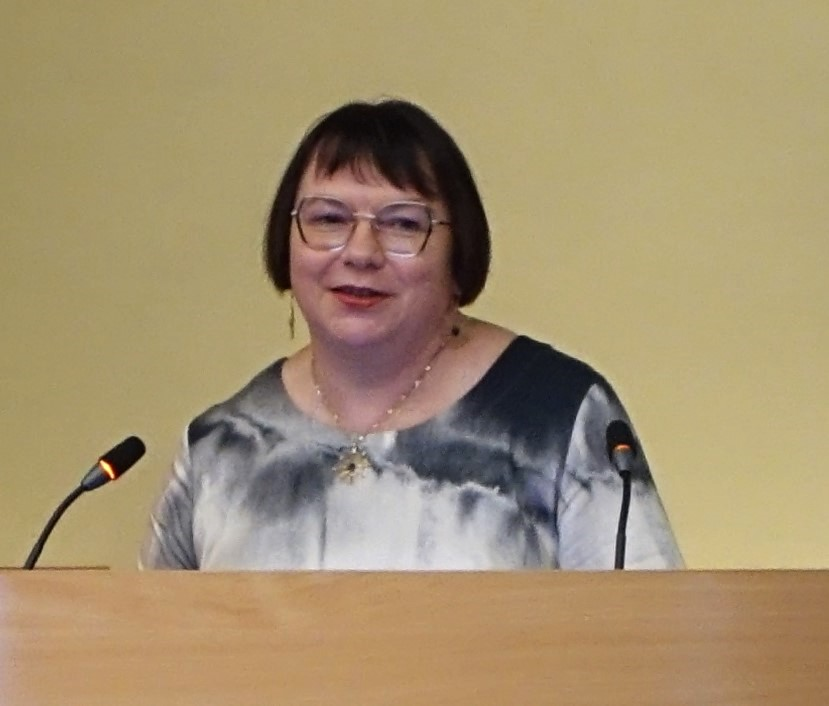
- Born: 1965 (age 60–61); Warsaw, Poland
- Education: University of Warsaw (MSc, PhD), Polish Academy of Sciences (DSc)
- Known for: Mathematical modeling in biology and medicine; cancer therapy modeling
- Awards: Hugo Steinhaus Award (2025)
- Scientific career
- Fields: Applied mathematics, Mathematical biology, Biomedical engineering
- Workplaces: University of Warsaw
- Doctoral advisor: Andrzej Palczewski (after Wiesław Szlenk)
- Doctoral students: Jan Poleszczuk (2014,2015), Piotr Bajger (2021), Marcin Choinski(2022)
- Website: mimuw.edu.pl/~urszula

Urszula Alicja Foryś (born 1965 in Warsaw, Poland) is a Polish mathematician specializing in applied mathematics, mathematical biology, and biomedical engineering. She is a professor at the University of Warsaw and is known for her research on mathematical modeling of cancer therapy and biological dynamical systems. Foryś has supervised numerous doctoral students, including Jan Poleszczuk, and is a laureate of the Polish Mathematical Society's Hugo Steinhaus Award (2025). She is also an accomplished powerlifting athlete.

== Early life and education ==
Foryś attended Primary School No. 1 and Jan Śniadecki High School XXX in Warsaw. In 1989 she received a Master of Science degree with honours in applied mathematics from the University of Warsaw's Faculty of Mathematics, Informatics and Mechanics (MIM), under the supervision of Wiesław Szlenk. She completed her Ph.D. in 1996 with the dissertation Global analysis of the Marczuk model for the immune organism and the immunodeficient organism, supervised by Szlenk and, following his death, by Andrzej Palczewski.

In 2007, she received her habilitation (D.Sc.) in biocybernetics and biomedical engineering from the Nałęcz Institute of Biocybernetics and Biomedical Engineering, Polish Academy of Sciences, for the dissertation Mathematical modelling of tumour development taking into account various stages of tumour growth. On 20 June 2018, the President of the Republic of Poland conferred on her the title of professor of mathematical sciences.

== Academic career ==
Since 1989 Foryś has worked at the Institute of Applied Mathematics and Mechanics (MIM), University of Warsaw, where she advanced from junior assistant to full professor (2019). She currently leads the Division of Biomathematics and Game Theory, which she helped establish in 2013.

She has held visiting positions at the China University of Geosciences in Wuhan (2011–2014) and has collaborated with numerous research centers, including the Autonomous University of Barcelona, the Institute for Medical Biomathematics in Bene Atarot, Israel, and the University of Dundee in Scotland. She was also a member of the Cooperation Group "Multiscale Modeling of Tumor Initiation, Growth and Progression" at the Center for Interdisciplinary Research (ZiF) of Bielefeld University.

In 2019–2020 she carried out research at the Institute for Medical Biomathematics (Israel) under the Bekker Programme of the Polish National Agency for Academic Exchange (NAWA).

== Research ==
Foryś's research focuses on applications of finite- and infinite-dimensional dynamical systems to biomedicine, ecology, and social sciences. Her scientific output includes about 100 research papers indexed in MathSciNet and zbMATH, as well as educational and outreach publications. She is the author of the textbook Matematyka w biologii (Mathematics in Biology, WNT, 2005), and the co-translator (with Marek Bodnar) of James D. Murray's Mathematical Biology I: An Introduction into Polish (PWN, 2006).

She has collaborated with international teams on cancer therapy modeling, including studies on CAR-T cell therapy for glioblastoma and hormone-sensitive prostate cancer treatment.

Her doctoral students include Jan Poleszczuk (2014,2015), Piotr Bajger (2021), and Marcin Choinski(2022).

== Professional and community service ==
Foryś is a founding member of the European Society for Mathematical and Theoretical Biology (ESMTB) and participated in the first European Conference on Mathematics Applied to Biology and Medicine (L'Alpe d'Huez, 1991). She has served in leadership roles within the Polish Mathematical Society (PTM), including as president of its Warsaw Branch (2019–2023) and vice-president (2023–2025). She is also an editor of Mathematica Applicanda and organized the exhibition *On Mathematics and Mathematicians* in the Senate of Poland (2019).

She co-founded and serves as vice-president of the Polish Women in Mathematics Association(PTKwM) since 2016, and since 2024 has been a member of the Commission on Mathematical Applications of the Polish Academy of Sciences. She also chairs the Scientific Committee of the National Conference on Mathematical Applications in Biology and Medicine (KKZMBM).

== Sports career ==
Outside academia, Foryś is an experienced powerlifter, representing TKKF Herkules Warszawa. She is a multiple Polish champion, European Masters II Champion (2015), and World Vice-Champion Masters III (2025).

== Awards ==
- Hugo Steinhaus Award of the Polish Mathematical Society (2025).
