= Mathematica Applicanda =

Journal covering applied mathematics

- Discipline: Applied mathematics
- Language: English
- Edited by: Agnieszka Wyłomańska

Publication details
- Former name(s): Matematyka Stosowana, Matematyka Stosowana-Matematyka dla Społeczeństwa
- History: 1973–present
- Publisher: Polish Mathematical Society (Poland)
- Frequency: Biannually

Standard abbreviations
- ISO 4: Math. Appl.
- MathSciNet: Math. Appl. (Warsaw)

Indexing
- ISSN: 1730-2668 (print); 2299-4009 (web)
- LCCN: 73645762
- OCLC no.: 52075022
- Matematyka Stosowana-Matematyka dla Społeczeństwa
- ISSN: 1730-2668

Links
- Journal homepage; Online access; Online archive; EuDML

Mathematica Applicanda is a peer-reviewed scientific journal covering applied mathematics. It was established in 1973 by the Polish Mathematical Society as Series III of the Annales Societatis Mathematicae Polonae, under the name Matematyka Stosowana (ISSN 0137-2890). The first editor-in-chief was Marceli Stark. In 1999 the journal was renamed Matematyka Stosowana-Matematyka dla Społeczeństwa (ISSN 1730-2668 ). Since 2012 its main issue is the electronic one with the name Mathematica Applicanda with ISSN 2299-4009.

== Former Editors-in-chief ==
- Marceli Stark (volume I[1973])
- Robert Bartoszyński (volumes II[1974] - XXIX[1987])
- Andrzej Kiełbasiński (volumes XXX[1987] - XLI[1999])
- Witold Kosiński (volumes XLII[2000] - XLIV[2011])
- Krzysztof J. Szajowski (volumes XL[2012] - XLVII[2019])
- Krzysztof Burnecki (volume LXVIII[2020] )
- Jacek Miękisz (volume XLIX[2021] - L[2022])
- Agnieszka Wyłomańska (volume LI[2023- ] )

== Abstracting and indexing ==
The journal is abstracted and indexed in

- MathSciNet
- Zentralblatt MATH
- CEON The Library of Science (Biblioteka Nauki)
- BazTech
- Scopus
- Index Copernicus

== See also ==
- List of mathematical physics journals
- List of probability journals
- List of statistics journals
