= Boris Mityagin =

Russian-American mathematician

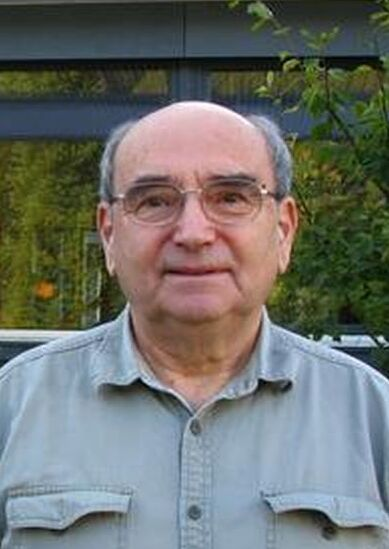
Boris Mityagin, Oberwolfach 2010

Boris Samuel Mityagin (Борис Самуилович Митягин, born 12 August 1937, Voronezh) is a Russian-American mathematician.

Mityagin received in 1961 his candidate degree (Ph.D.) under Georgiy Shilov at the Moscow State University and in 1963 his Russian doctorate (higher doctoral degree). He was a researcher at the Central Economic Mathematical Institute of the Soviet Academy of Sciences. In 1979 he became a professor at Ohio State University.

His research deals with functional analysis and mathematical physics (spectra of Schrödinger and Dirac operators).

In 1966 in Moscow he was (with A. Pełczyński) an Invited Speaker of the ICM.

In 1960 he received the prize of the Moscow Mathematical Society. In 2013 he was elected a Fellow of the American Mathematical Society.

== Selected publications ==
- Approximate dimension and bases in nuclear spaces, Russian Mathematical Surveys, vol. 16, 1961, pp. 59–127
- with Albert S. Schwarz: Functors in categories of Banach spaces, Russian Mathematical Surveys, vol. 19, 1964, pp. 65–127
- An interpolation theorem for modular spaces, Matematicheskii Sbornik, vol. 108, 1965, pp. 473–482
- The homotopy structure of the linear group of a Banach space, Russian Mathematical Surveys, vol. 25, 1970, pp. 59–103
- Equivalence of bases in Hilbert spaces, Studia Mathematica, vol. 37, 1971, p. 111
- with G. M. Henkin: Linear problems of complex analysis, Russian Mathematical Surveys, vol. 26, 1971, pp. 99–164
- Notes on mathematical economics, Russian Mathematical Surveys, vol. 27, 1972, pp. 1–19
- with M. I. Kadets: Complemented subspaces in Banach spaces, Russian Mathematical Surveys, vol. 28, 1973, pp. 77–95
- with E. M. Semenov: Lack of interpolation of linear operators in spaces of smooth functions, Mathematics of the USSR-Izvestiya, vol. 11, 1977, pp. 1229–1266
- Quadratic pencils and least-squares piecewise-polynomial approximation, Math. Comp., vol. 40, 1983, pp. 283–300 doi:10.1090/S0025-5718-1983-0679446-0
- with I. Aharoni and Bernard Maurey: Uniform embeddings of metric spaces and of Banach spaces into Hilbert spaces, Israel Journal of Mathematics, vol. 52, 1985, pp. 251–265
- with Vitaly Bergelson and Isaac Kornfeld: Unitary Z^{d}-actions with continuous spectrum, Proc. Amer. Math. Soc., vol. 119, 1993, pp. 1127–1134 doi:10.1090/S0002-9939-1993-1145413-4
- with Thomas Kappeler: Gap estimates of the spectrum of Hill's equation and action variables for KdV. Trans. Amer. Math. Soc., vol. 351, 1999, 619–646 doi:10.1090/S0002-9947-99-02186-8
- with Thomas Kappeler: Estimates for periodic and Dirichlet eigenvalues of the Schrödinger operator, SIAM journal on mathematical analysis, vol. 33, 2001, pp. 113–152
- Spectral expansions of one-dimensional periodic Dirac operators, Dyn. Partial Diff. Eq., vol. 1, 2004, pp. 125–191
- with Plamen Diakov: Instability zones of periodic 1-dimensional Schrödinger and Dirac operators, Russian Mathematical Surveys, vol. 61, 2006, p. 663
