= Swatek =

Swatek is a surname. Notable people with the surname include:

- Barret Swatek (born 1977), American actress and comedian
- Edwin Swatek (1885–1966), American swimmer and water polo player

== See also ==
- Świątek
