= Nicole Tomczak-Jaegermann =

Polish Canadian mathematician (1945–2022)

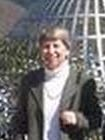
- Tomczak-Jaegermann in 2003
- Born: 8 June 1945; Paris, France
- Died: 17 June 2022 (aged 77); Edmonton, Alberta, Canada
- Known for: Banach Space Theory
- Awards: Krieger–Nelson Prize (1999); CRM-Fields-PIMS Prize (2006); Sierpiński Medal (2013)

Academic work
- Discipline: Mathematician

Nicole Tomczak-Jaegermann FRSC (8 June 1945 – 17 June 2022) was a Polish-Canadian mathematician, a professor of mathematics at the University of Alberta, and the holder of the Canada Research Chair in Geometric Analysis.

== Contributions ==
Her research is in geometric functional analysis, and is unusual in combining asymptotic analysis with the theory of Banach spaces and infinite-dimensional convex bodies. It formed a key component of Fields medalist Timothy Gowers' solution to Stefan Banach's homogeneous space problem, posed in 1932. Her 1989 monograph on Banach–Mazur distances is also highly cited.

== Education and career ==
Tomczak-Jaegermann earned her M.S. in 1968 from the University of Warsaw, and her Ph.D. from the same university in 1974, under the supervision of Aleksander Pełczyński. She remained on the faculty at the University of Warsaw from 1975 until 1983, when she moved to Alberta.

== Recognition ==
In 1996, Tomczak-Jaegermann was elected to the Royal Society of Canada, and in 1999 she won the Krieger–Nelson Prize for an outstanding female Canadian mathematician. In 1998 she was an Invited Speaker of the International Congress of Mathematicians in Berlin. She was the winner of the 2006 CRM-Fields-PIMS prize for exceptional research in mathematics. In 2013, she was awarded the Sierpiński Medal conferred jointly by the Polish Mathematical Society and the University of Warsaw.

== Death ==
Tomczak-Jaegermann died on 17 June 2022 at the age 77 in Edmonton, Alberta, Canada.
