= Jan Poleszczuk =

Polish mathematician and biologist

- Born: 19 October 1986 (age 39); Poland
- Education: University of Warsaw (MSc 2010, PhD 2015); Silesian University of Technology (PhD 2014)
- Known for: Mathematical modeling in oncology; modeling of gene expression; optimization of radiotherapy and chemotherapy
- Awards: POLITYKA Science Award (2017)
- Scientific career
- Fields: Mathematics; Biocybernetics; Biomedical engineering
- Workplaces: Nałęcz Institute of Biocybernetics and Biomedical Engineering, Polish Academy of Sciences; Maria Skłodowska-Curie National Research Institute of Oncology
- Thesis: Mathematical modeling of cancer cell response to therapy-induced stress (2014); Exploring potential tumor growth modulating mechanisms in cells having different status of TP53 gene (2015)
- Doctoral advisor: Maria Wideł and Urszula Alicja Foryś
- Website: jpoleszczuk.pl

Jan Poleszczuk (born 19 October 1986) is a Polish mathematician and biomedical engineer specializing in mathematical modeling in oncology. He is a researcher at the Nałęcz Institute of Biocybernetics and Biomedical Engineering of the Polish Academy of Sciences and a laureate of the Polityka Science Award (2017). His work concerns tumor growth dynamics, gene-expression modeling and optimization of radio- and chemotherapy.

== Early life and education ==
Poleszczuk was born in Poland on 19 October 1986. He received his Master of Science degree in mathematical methods in biology and social sciences from the University of Warsaw in 2010, defending a thesis on modeling tumor angiogenesis and anti-angiogenic therapy based on the Hahnfeldt model.

Under the supervision of Maria Wideł and co-supervision of Urszula Alicja Foryś, he earned a Ph.D. in biocybernetics and biomedical engineering from the Silesian University of Technology in 2014 for the dissertation Mathematical modeling of cancer cell response to therapy-induced stress. He subsequently obtained a Ph.D. in mathematics from the University of Warsaw in 2015 with the thesis Exploring potential tumor growth modulating mechanisms in cells having different status of TP53 gene.

In 2020 he was awarded the habilitation (D.Sc.) in biomedical engineering by the Nałęcz Institute of Biocybernetics and Biomedical Engineering, Polish Academy of Sciences, for his work Mathematical modeling in the study of evolution and treatment of cancer with radio and immunotherapy.

== Academic career ==
Since 2012 Poleszczuk has been affiliated with the Nałęcz Institute of Biocybernetics and Biomedical Engineering of the Polish Academy of Sciences, where he works on quantitative models of tumor response to therapy and radiobiological optimization. He has also collaborated with the Maria Skłodowska-Curie National Research Institute of Oncology on mathematical and computational methods in radiotherapy planning.

== Research ==
Poleszczuk has authored or co-authored more than 60 scientific articles indexed in MathSciNet, Zentralblatt MATH, and PubMed. His most cited works include Stochastic models of gene expression with delayed degradation (co-authored with Jacek Miȩkisz, Marek Bodnar and Urszula Foryś) published in Bulletin of Mathematical Biology (2011) and Mathematical modelling of immune reaction against gliomas: Sensitivity analysis and influence of delays (2013).

His research integrates mathematical modeling, systems biology, and biomedical engineering to understand interactions between gene mutations and tumor growth and to improve therapeutic protocols in radiotherapy and chemotherapy.

== Awards and membership ==
- Laureate of the POLITYKA Science Award (2017).
- Member of the Polish Mathematical Society (Treasurer 2017–2020).
- Member of the Polish Radiation Research Society, the Society for Mathematical Biology, and the American Association for Cancer Research.
