= Stanisław Szarek =

Polish mathematician

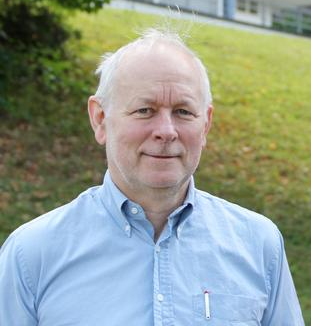
Stanisław J. Szarek (2014)

Stanisław J. Szarek (born November 13, 1953) is a Polish professor of mathematics at both Case Western Reserve University in the USA (since 1983) and Pierre and Marie Curie University in France (since 1996). His research concerns convex geometry and functional analysis.

Szarek was born in Lądek-Zdrój, Poland. He earned a master's degree from the University of Warsaw in 1976, and a Ph.D. from the Polish Academy of Sciences in 1979 under the supervision of Aleksander Pełczyński. He continued at the Polish Academy as a research fellow for four years before taking a faculty position at Case, where he is now the Kerr Professor of Mathematics.

Szarek won a gold medal in the 1971 International Mathematical Olympiad. He was an invited speaker at the 2006 International Congress of Mathematicians. In 2007 he won the Langevin Prize of the French Academy of Sciences. In 2012 he became one of the inaugural fellows of the American Mathematical Society and in 2017 he was awarded the Sierpiński Medal conferred jointly by the Polish Mathematical Society and the University of Warsaw.
