= Wacław Marzantowicz =

Polish mathematician (born 1950)

Wacław Bolesław Marzantowicz
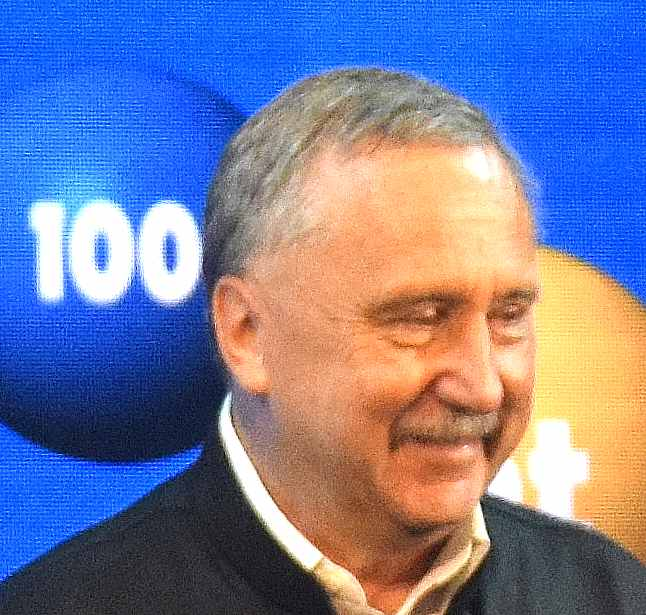
- Wacław Bolesław Marzantowicz
- Born: 18 June 1950 (age 76); Poznań, Poland
- Education: Gdańsk University; Adam Mickiewicz University
- Awards: Stefan Banach Prize (2003)
- Scientific career
- Fields: Mathematics
- Workplaces: Adam Mickiewicz University
- Thesis: Lefschetz Numbers of Maps Commuting with an Action of a Group (PhD) 13 May 1977; Habilitation 22 June 1991; Professorship 15 March 2002
- Doctoral advisor: Kazimierz Gęba
- Doctoral students: Advisor or co-advisor for 6 PhDs; Andrzej Łecki; Grzegorz Piotr Graff; Justyna Signerska; Piotr Nowak-Przygodzki; Nelson Silva; Łukasz Michalak
- Website: www.staff.amu.edu.pl/~marzan/

Wacław Bolesław Marzantowicz is a Polish mathematician known for his contributions in number theory and topology. He was President of the Polish Mathematical Society from 2014 to 2019.

== Biography ==
In 1967 he became the finalist of the 18th Mathematical Olympiad. In 1972, he graduated in mathematics at Adam Mickiewicz University in Poznań. He obtained his doctorate in Institute of Mathematics of the Polish Academy of Sciences in 1977, based on the work Lefschetz Numbers of Maps Commuting with an Action of a Group written under the direction Kazimierz Gęba. He got habilitation there in 1991, based on the work Invariant topology methods used in variational problems.

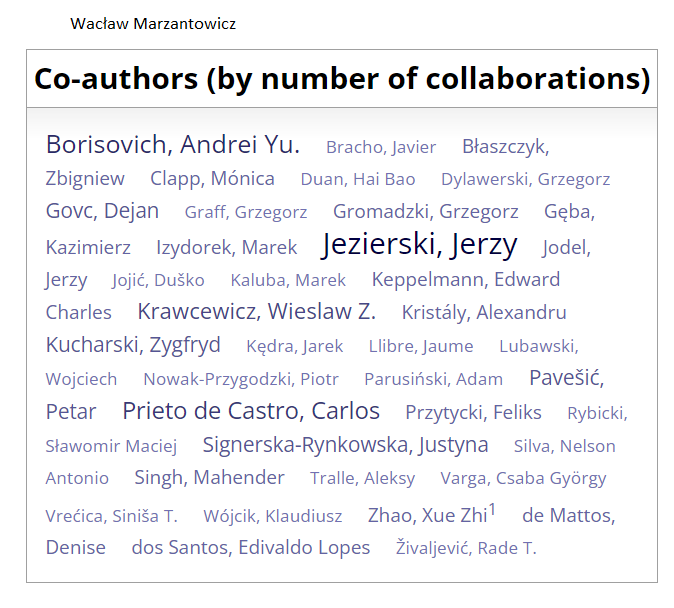
Co-authors of Wacław Marzantowicz based on the number of publications indexed in MathSciNet (as of May 1, 2024).

From 1993 to 1996, he was the director of the Institute of Mathematics University of Gdańsk. Since 1996, he has been working at Faculty of Mathematics and Computer Science at the Adam Mickiewicz University in Poznań, where he heads the Department of Geometry and Topology. In 2002 he received the title of professor of mathematics. References to his papers can be found in mathematical databases.

From 1993 to 1996, he was the president of the Gdańsk Branch of the Polish Mathematical Society (PMS) and then its vice president (2011–2013). Since 2014, he has been the president of the Polish Mathematical Society.

== Honours and awards ==
Since 1995, he has been a member of the Scientific Council of the Juliusz Schauder Center for Nonlinear Studies at Nicolaus Copernicus University in Toruń, of which he was the Chairman from 2012 to 2018. He has served multiple terms on the Mathematics Committee of the Polish Academy of Sciences (PAN), including the term 2024-2027. From 2016 to 2019, he was a representative of the Polish Mathematical Society (PTM) in the international mathematical cooperation program Silk-Road, conducted by the Chinese Mathematical Society. From 2010 to 2020, he represented PTM on the Council of the European Mathematical Society (EMS), and for the term 2021-2023, he was elected as a representative of individual members of EMS to this council.

He became the joint recipient of the Stefan Banach Prize of the Polish Mathematical Society (alongside Jerzy Jezierski).
