= Witold Kosiński =

Polish mathematician and computer scientist

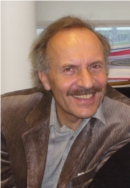
- Born: August 13, 1946; Kraków, Poland
- Died: 14 March 2014 (aged 67); Warsaw, Poland

Academic background
- Education: University of Warsaw

Witold Kosiński (August 13, 1946 in Kraków – March 14, 2014 in Warsaw) was a Polish mathematician and computer scientist. He was the lead inventor and main propagator of Ordered Fuzzy Numbers (now named after him: Kosiński's Fuzzy Numbers).

For many years Professor Witold Kosiński was associated with the Institute of Fundamental Technological Research of the Polish Academy of Sciences. He has also worked as the Vice-Chancellor of the Polish-Japanese Institute of Information Technology - PJIIT (now called Polish-Japanese Academy of Information Technology) in Warsaw and the Head of the Artificial Systems Division at the PJIIT. Finally, he was a lecturer at the Faculty of Mathematics, Physics and Technical Sciences, the Kazimierz Wielki University in Bydgoszcz.

Professor Kosiński was a researcher specialising in continuum mechanics, thermodynamics, and wave propagation as well as in mathematical foundations of information technology and particularly in artificial intelligence, fuzzy logic and evolutionary algorithms. His fields of research have also comprised applied mathematics and partial differential equations of hyperbolic type as well as neural networks and computational intelligence.

He was a scientist, mentor to scientific staff and several generations of students, as well as an active athlete.

== Education and career ==
Professor Kosiński defended his Master's Thesis, "On the existence of functions of two variables satisfying some differential inequality", at the Faculty of Mathematics and Mechanics at the University of Warsaw in 1969.

Three years later, in 1972, he obtained a Doctor of Science degree and then in 1984 a further dr hab. ("doktor habilitowany") degree (see: Habilitation) at the Institute of the Fundamental Technological Research in the Polish Academy of Sciences (IPPT PAN). He was elevated to the degree of Professor in 1993 through a formal nomination by the President of the Republic of Poland.

Over 25 years (1973–1999) he has worked at the Institute of Fundamental Technological Research in the Polish Academy of Science in Warsaw; first as an Assistant, later as an Associate Professor and finally (in 1993) as a Full Professor. Between 1986 and 1999 he headed the Division of Optical and Computer Methods in Mechanics IPPT PAN (SPOKoMM).

In 1999 he obtained the position of Vice-Chancellor (scientific affairs) (“Vice-Rektor”) at the Polish-Japanese Institute of Information Technology (PJIIT) in Warsaw, a position that he held till 2005. At the PJIIT he was also the Head of Artificial Systems Division and of the Research Center. In addition he was a member of the PJIIT Senate and of the Council of the Faculty of Information Technology PJIIT.

In 1996 he joined the Department of Environmental Mechanics at The Higher Pedagogical School in Bydgoszcz. In 2005, with the establishment of the Kazimierz Wielki University in Bydgoszcz, Kosiński became a Head of the Department of Database Systems and Computational Intelligence at the Faculty of Mathematics, Physics and Technical Sciences at the Institute of Mechanics and Applied Computer Science at that University. In 2009, he became a Chairman of the Council of this Institute.

He managed several scientific projects financed by the Polish State Committee for Scientific Research (KBN). He participated in numerous international conferences and worked as a contract lecturer in Poland (e.g. at Bialystok University of Technology and Warsaw University of Life Sciences) and abroad.

== International collaboration ==
Between 1975–1976 he was in the US as a National Science Foundation post-doctoral research fellow at the Division of Materials Engineering, the University of Iowa. Later as a research fellow of Alexander von Humboldt Foundation he undertook several research visits to numerous German scientific institutes, incl. Institute for Applied Mathematics of the University of Bonn (1983–1985), Institute for Applied Mathematics of the Heidelberg University and Institute of Mechanics of the Technische Universität Darmstadt (1988).

Subsequently, he became a visiting professor at the following institutions: LMM, Universite Pierre et Marie Curie (Paris VI), at Universite d'Aix – Marseille III, France, Department of Mathematical and Computer Sciences, Loyola University New Orleans, USA, Dublin Institute for Advanced Studies, Ireland, Nagoya University, Japan, and departments of mathematics of the following universities: Genova, Ferrara, Catania, Napoli, Potenza, Univ. Roma "La Sapienza" and Terza, Italy and Rostock, Germany.

In addition, he was a research fellow of the Japan International Cooperation Agency (JICA) and participated in several research and training programs in Japan.

== Books and work as a supervisor ==
Kosiński was an editor of many volumes of collective works and conference materials and an author of two monographs:

1. W. Kosiński: Field Singularities and Wave Analysis in Continuum Mechanics. Ellis Horwood Series: Mathematics and Its Applications, Ellis Horwood Ltd., Chichester, Halsted Press: a Division of John Wiley & Sons, New York Chichester Brisbane Toronto, PWN – Polish Scientific Publishers, Warsaw (1986)
2. W. Kosiński: Wstęp do teorii osobliwości pola i analizy fal. PWN, Warsaw – Poznań (1981)

as well as over 230 of other scientific publications.

He was a supervisor of 11 Ph.D. theses (10 of which dealt with informatics) and a number of Engineering Diploma works and Master Theses. He was a member of editorial boards of several journals as well as a member of numerous Polish and international scientific associations. Between 2000–2011 he was an Editor-in-Chief of the Annales Societatis Mathematicae Polonae Series III. Mathematica Applicanda (a journal of the Polish Mathematical Society).
