= Grzegorz Świątek =

Polish mathematician (born 1964)

Grzegorz Świątek (born 1964) is a Polish mathematician, currently a professor at the Warsaw University of Technology. He is known for his contributions to dynamical systems.

Świątek earned his PhD from the University of Warsaw under supervision of Michał Misiurewicz in 1987. Then he has held academic positions in Poland and the US (including the Pennsylvania State University). He is currently a professor at the Warsaw University of Technology. He published his scientific work in such journals as Annals of Mathematics, Inventiones Mathematicae and Duke Mathematical Journal. With Jacek Graczyk he provided a rigorous proof of the real Fatou conjecture.

Świątek was an invited speaker at International Congress of Mathematicians in Berlin in 1998, and at the conference Dynamics, Equations and Applications in Kraków in 2019.

In 2007, he received the Stefan Banach Prize of the Polish Mathematical Society.
