= Jan Hartman (philosopher) =

Polish philosopher, politician (born 1967)

Jan Marek Hartman
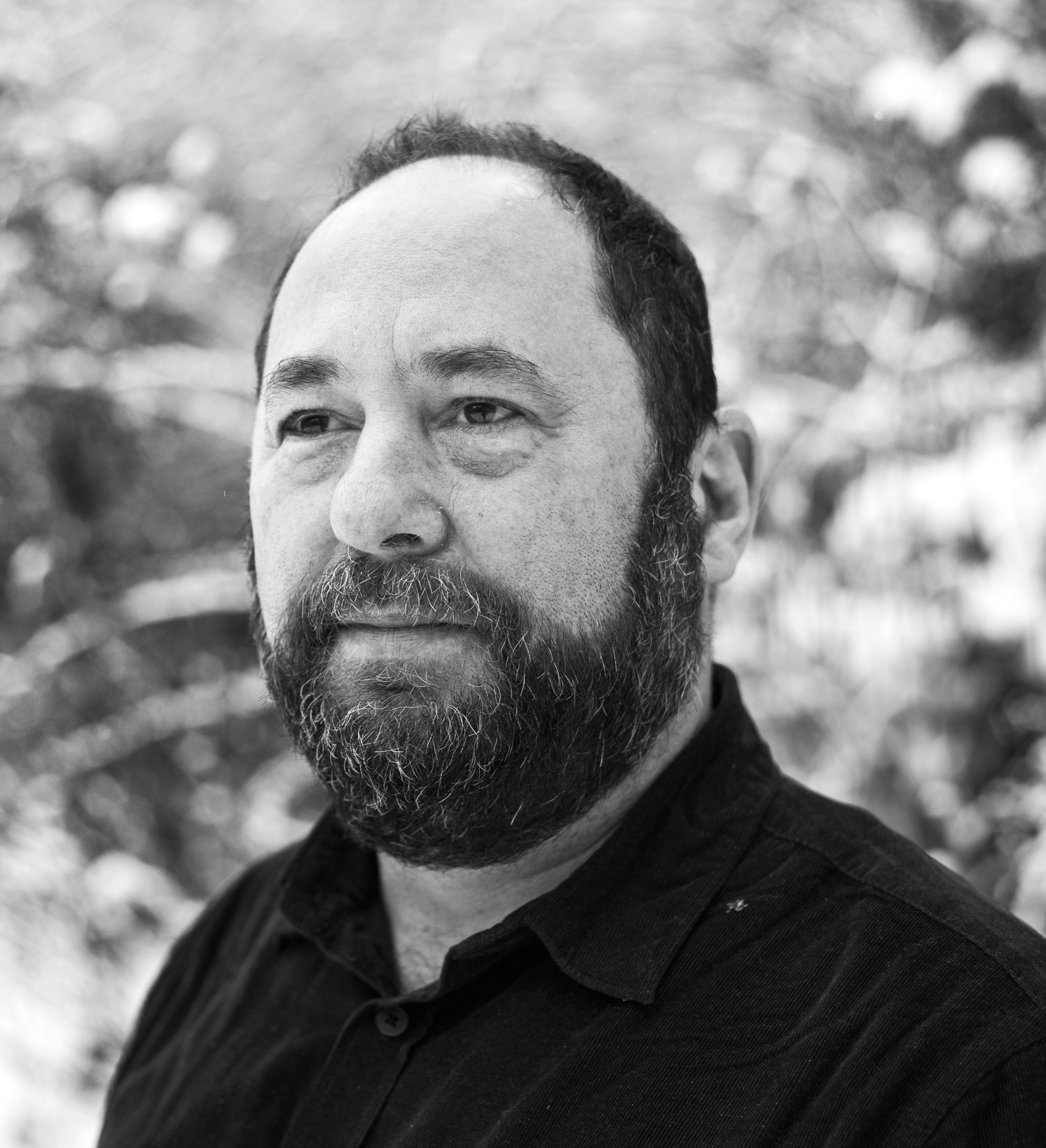
- Jan Hartman (2021)
- Born: 18 March 1967 (age 59); Wrocław, Poland
- Citizenship: Polish
- Education: Catholic University of Lublin
- Occupations: Philosopher and bioethicist
- Employer: Jagiellonian University
- Parent: Stanisław Hartman

Jan Marek Hartman (born 18 March 1967 in Wrocław) is a Polish-Jewish philosopher specializing in bioethics, writer, anticlerical, opinion journalist and politician, professor at the Jagiellonian University.

== Biography ==
=== Origin ===
He was born as the son of Stanisław Hartman, a mathematics professor, and a great-great-grandson of rabbi Izaak Kramsztyk.

=== Early life and education ===
Hartman graduated from the Catholic University of Lublin in 1990. He received doctorate from the Jagiellonian University in 1995, upon dissertation Problematyka heurystyki filozoficznej supervised by Władysław Stróżewski.

=== Professional work ===
In 1994, Hartman was appointed an assistant professor at the Institute of Philosophy at the Jagiellonian University, then in 1995 an associate professor in the Department of Philosophy and Bioethics at the Jagiellonian University Medical College. In 2003 he became the head of the department, and in 2008 was appointed Full Professor of Humane Sciences.

Between 2013 and 2014, he was a member of Polish national ethics committee (Komisja do spraw etyki w ochronie zdrowia).

In his philosophical work Hartman focuses on ethics and bioethics, his scientific interests also include especially metaphilosophy and political philosophy.

Hartman is also known as a left-winged publicist, he's been publishing in magazines such as Gazeta Wyborcza, Tygodnik Powszechny, Dziennik Gazeta Prawna, Rzeczpospolita, Polityka, Newsweek Polska and Przekrój. In 2009 he was awarded with Grand Press for the best publicist.

He is active in the politics. In 2011 Polish parliamentary election he was a candidate for the MP of Democratic Left Alliance. He received 2209 votes and didn't manage to get to the parliament.

Hartman had been a member of the anti-clerical Your Movement party from its inception in October 2013 to September 2014, having been considered one its key members. 2014 proved to be very onerous for the party when it received mere 3.6% of the votes in the elections to the European Parliament of 2014, lagging far behind its rivalry Democratic of the Left Alliance. The precarious voting results threatened the very existence of the party when many of its members quit. Despite proving his loyalty, Hartman soon lost his membership after publishing on his blog an article regarding recent debates on the legality of incest in Germany (by the Deutscher Ethikrat) and proposing to open a discussion on this topic in Poland. The public opinion was outraged and went as far as to accuse him of espousing incest, which he denied. Soon, a voting inside the party was held and Hartman was expelled, having lost 7 to 1. Hartman condemned the decision, criticising it as "curtailing freedom of speech in a party whose main precept was in fact freedom".

=== Family ===
In 1989 Jan Hartman married Barbara, a sociologist. Their daughter, Zofia, was born in 1998.

== Books ==
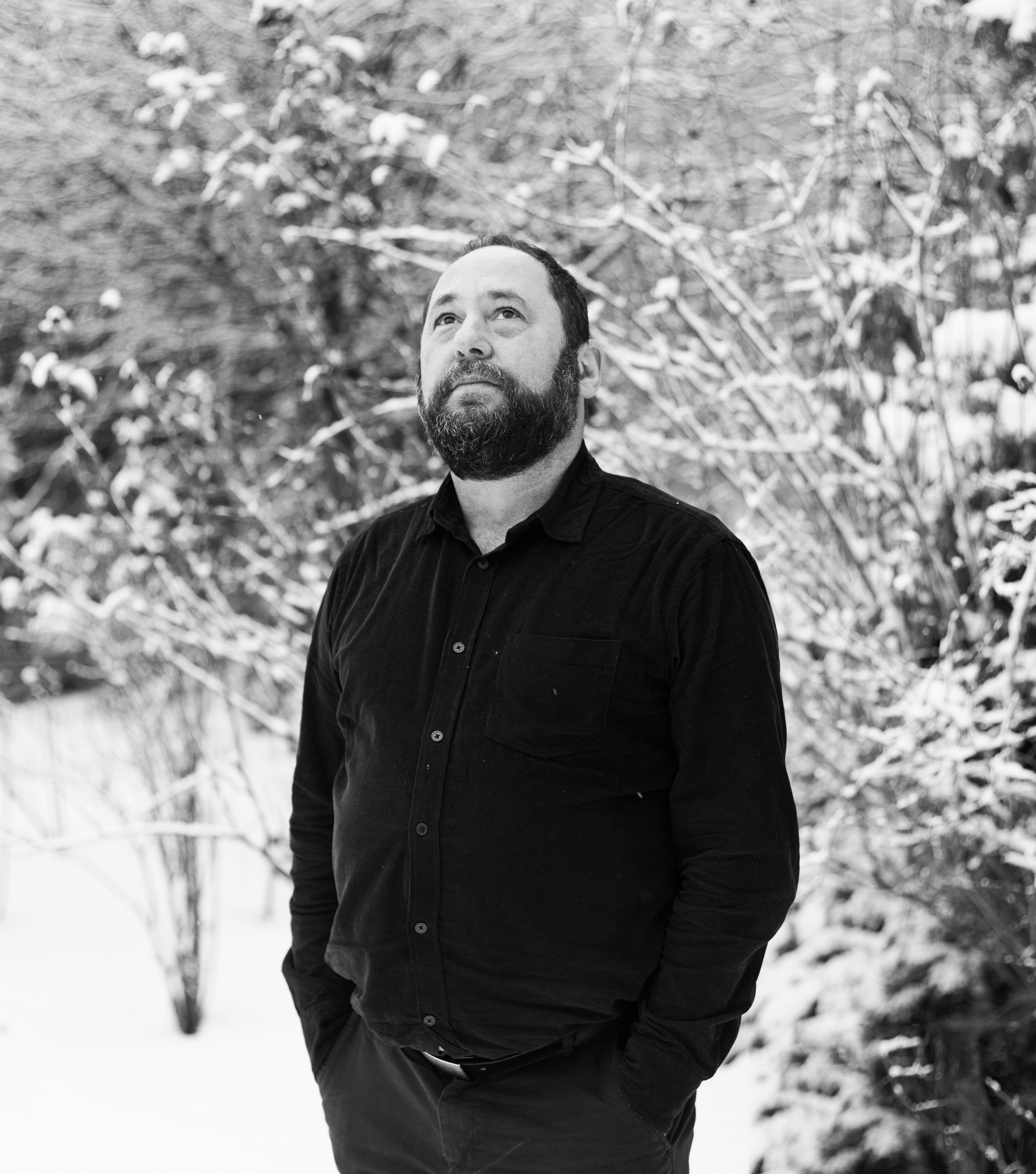
Jan Hartman (2021)

- Sposób istnienia rzeczy materialnej według Sporu o istnienie świata R. Ingardena. Lublin: UMCS. 1993.
- Heurystyka filozoficzna. Wrocław: Monografie FNP. 1997.
- Jak poważnie studiować filozofię. Kraków: Aureus. 1998. 2005. 2012.
- Techniki metafilozofii. Kraków: Aureus. 2001.
- Medytacje o filozofii pierwszej (translation of work by René Descartes), Zielona Sowa, Kraków 2002, 2004.
- Short Studies in Bioethics. Kraków: Aureus. 2003.
- Wstęp do filozofii. Warszawa: Wydawnictwo Naukowe PWN. 2005. 2006. 2008.
- Przez filozofię. Kraków: Aureus. 2007.
- Wiedza o etyce. Bielsko-Biała: Wydawnictwa Szkolne PWN. 2008. 2009. Co-authored with Jan Woleński.
- Bioetyka dla lekarzy. Warszawa: Oficyna Wolters Kluwer Polska. 2009. 2011.
- Widzialna ręka rynku. Filozofia w marketingu. Kraków: Aureus. 2010.
- Polityka filozofii. Eseje. Kraków: Universitas. 2010.
- Wiedza – Byt – Człowiek. Z głównych zagadnień filozofii. Kraków: Universitas. 2011.
- Zebra Hartmana. Łódź: Industrial. 2011.
- Głupie pytania. Warszawa: Agora. 2013.
- Etyka. Poradnik dla grzeszników. Warszawa: Agora. 2015.
- Polityka. Władza i nadzieja. Agora. 2017.
- Pochwała litości. Rzecz o wspólnocie. Kraków: Wydawnictwo Uniwersytetu Jagiellońskiego. 2017.
- Pochwała wolności. Kraków: Wydawnictwo Uniwersytetu Jagiellońskiego. 2020.
- Etyka życia codziennego. PWN. 2021.
- Spowiedź antychrysta. Austeria. 2022.
- Zmierzch filozofii. Austeria. 2023.
- Filozofia. Warszawa: PWN. 2024.
- Etyka życia publicznego. Warszawa: PWN. 2025.
