= Stanisław Hartman =

Stanisław Hartman (2 August 1914 – 11 November 1992) was a mathematician.

== Biography ==
He was born in Warsaw as the son of Kazimierz and Janina.

In 1937 he graduated from the Institute of Mathematics of the University of Warsaw. In 1941 he graduated in physics from the Lviv University. He obtained doctorate in 1947 and habilitation in 1951. In 1953 he received Stefan Banach Prize. He was dismissed from work at the University of Wrocław in 1968. From 1968 to 1980 he worked at the Institute of Mathematics of the Polish Academy of Sciences.

His son Jan Hartman became a philosopher.

== Books ==
- Wspomnienia (lwowskie i inne). Wrocław: Instytut Matematyczny Uniwersytetu Wrocławskiego. 2014.
