= Ciesielski isomorphism =

In functional analysis, the Ciesielski's isomorphism establishes an isomorphism between the Banach space of Hölder continuous functions $C^{\alpha}([0,T],\mathbb{R})$, equipped with a norm, and the space of bounded sequences $\ell^{\infty}(\mathbb{R})$, equipped with the supremum norm, by coefficients of a Schauder basis along a sequence of dyadic partitions.

The statement was proved in 1960 by the Polish mathematician Zbigniew Ciesielski. The result can be applied in probability theory when dealing with paths of the Brownian motion.

== Ciesielski's isomorphism ==
Let $[0,T]$ be an intervall and let $\mathbb{T}=(\tau_n)_{n\in\mathbb{N}}$ be a sequence of dyadic partitions of $[0,T]$.

Let $C^{\alpha}([0,T],\mathbb{R})$ for $0<\alpha<1$ be a Banach space of Hölder continuous functions with norm

$$\|f\|_{C^{\alpha}}=\|f\|_{\infty}+|f|_{C^{\alpha}}:=\sup\limits_{t\in [0,T]}|f(t)|+\sup\limits_{\begin{matrix}s,t\in[0,T]\\ s\neq t\end{matrix}}\frac{|f(s)-f(t)|}{|s-t|^{\alpha}}$$

and $\ell^{\infty}(\mathbb{R})$ be the Banach space of bounded sequence with supremum norm

$$\|a\|_{\infty}:=\sup\limits_{n}|a_n|$$.

The map $S\colon C^{\alpha}([0,T],\mathbb{R})\to \ell^{\infty}(\mathbb{R})$ defined as

$$f\mapsto \left(2^{(m+1)\left(\alpha-\tfrac{1}{2}\right)}|\theta(f)^{\mathbb{T}}_{m,k}| \right)_{m,k},\qquad (m,k)\in\mathbb{N}_0\times \{0,1,\dots,2^m-1\}$$

is an isomorphism, where $\theta(f)^{\mathbb{T}}_{m,k}$ are the Schauder coefficients of $f$ along $\mathbb{T}$ of $[0,T]$.

The Schauder coefficients are

$$\theta(f)^{\mathbb{T}}_{m,k}=\langle f',h_{m,k} \rangle_{L^1}=\int_0^T f'(x)h_{m,k}(x)dx.$$

for Haar functions $h_{m,k}$ based on the dyadic partition $\tau_m$.

=== Properties ===
- The result was generalized in 2025 for general partitions.
