= Leon Chwistek =

Polish philosopher and mathematician (1884–1944)

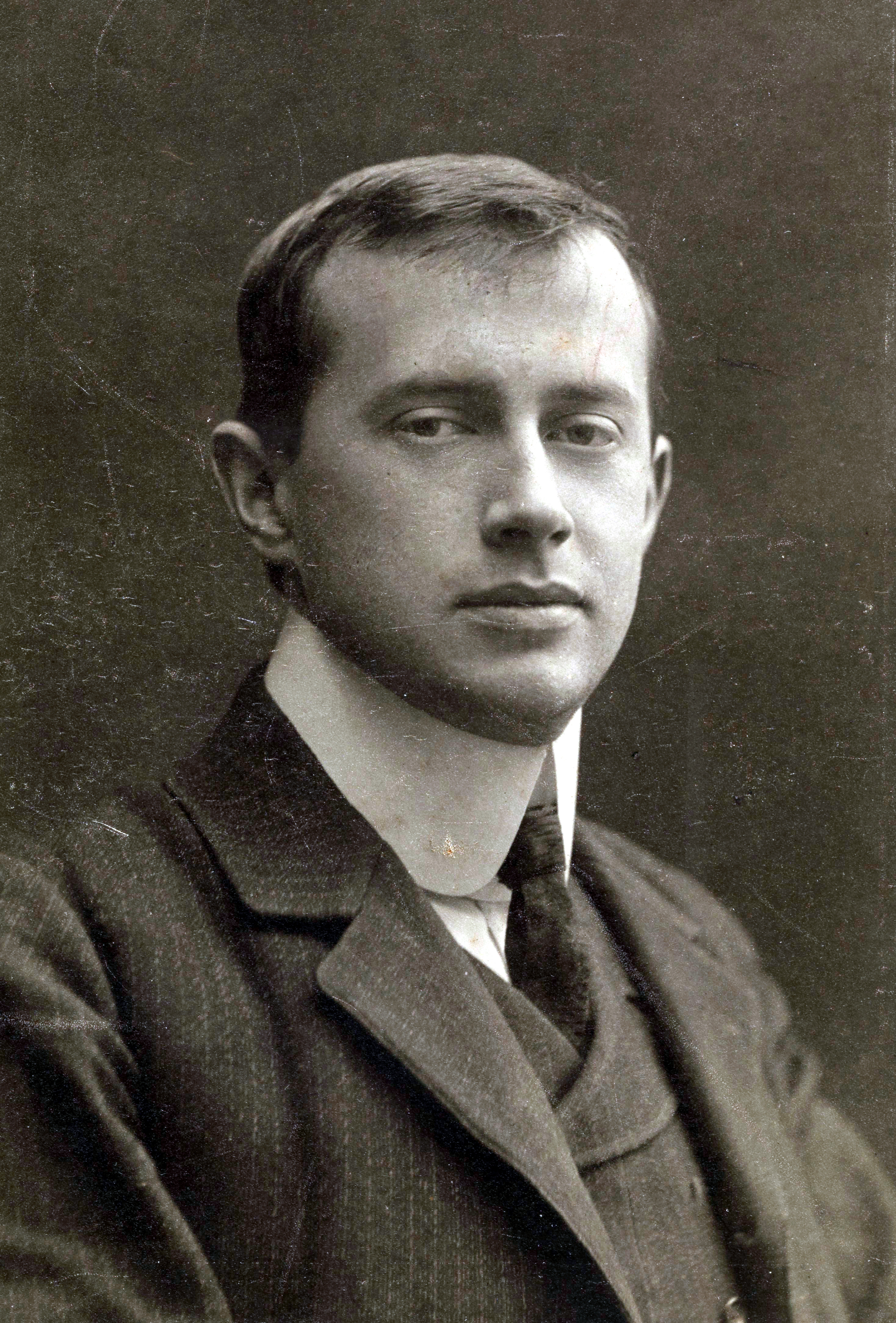
- Chwistek, c. 1907–1912
- Born: Leon Kazimierz Antoni Chwistek; 13 June 1884; Kraków, Austria-Hungary
- Died: 20 August 1944 (aged 60); Barvikha, Soviet Union
- Burial place: Donskoye Cemetery, Moscow, Russia

Education
- Education: Jagiellonian University
- Thesis: O aksjomatach (On Axioms) (1906)

Philosophical work
- Era: 20th-century philosophy
- Region: Western philosophy
- School: Analytic philosophy
- Institutions: Jagiellonian University; University of Lviv
- Main interests: Philosophy of science Mathematical logic Formal logic
- Notable works: The Limits of Science (1948)

Leon Chwistek (Polish: [ˈxfistɛk]; 13 June 1884, Kraków, Austria-Hungary – 20 August 1944, Barvikha near Moscow, Russia) was a Polish logician, philosopher, mathematician, avant-garde painter, theoretician of modern art and literary critic.

He mainly worked in the field of the philosophy of science and mathematical logic. As an artist, he was a representative of Polish Formism, drawing on Cubist and Futurist ideas. He taught at the Jagiellonian University and the University of Lviv and was one of the founders of the Polish Mathematical Society.

== Career and philosophy ==
He was born on 13 June 1884 in Kraków to Bronisław Chwistek and Emilia (née Majewska). His father was a physician who opened one of the first hydrotherapy establishments in Zakopane. His mother was a pianist and a painter whose teachers included Jan Matejko. Growing up in Zakopane, Chwistek became close friends with Stanisław Ignacy Witkiewicz and Bronisław Malinowski. He was also influenced by the young Felix Dzerzhinsky who introduced him to the ideas of socialism. In 1902, he graduated from the John Sobieski Gymnasium No. 3 in Kraków passing his Matura exam.

In 1906, he earned his doctorate at the Jagiellonian University. In 1908-1909, he studied philosophy in Göttingen. During this period, he attended lectures by David Hilbert and Henri Poincaré. He also met Hugo Steinhaus and his sister, Olga, whom he later married. In 1914-1916, he served in the Polish Legions. In 1919, Chwistek was one of the founders of the Polish Mathematical Society. From 1922, he lectured in mathematics at the Jagiellonian University, where he obtained his habilitation in 1928 in mathematical logic, based on his work entitled "The Theory of Constructive Types" published in Annales de la Société Polonaise de Mathématique.

In 1930, Chwistek was appointed Professor of Logic in the Department of Mathematical nad Natural Sciences at the University of Lwów in a position for which Alfred Tarski had also applied but on Bertrand Russell's recommendation it was offered to Chwistek. He visited the famous Scottish Café where he debated with such prominent mathematicians as Stefan Banach, Stanisław Ulam and Stanisław Mazur. His interests in the 1930s were in a general system of philosophy of science, which was published in a book in 1935 and translated into English in 1948 as The Limits of Science.

In the 1920s–30s, many European philosophers attempted to reform traditional philosophy by means of mathematical logic. Leon Chwistek did not believe that such reform could succeed. He thought that reality could not be described in one homogeneous system, based on the principles of formal logic, because there was not one reality but many.

After the outbreak of World War II and the occupation of Lwów (renamed to Lviv) by the USSR, he remained at the university. He also started cooperation with Czerwony Sztandar. In September 1940, he joined the Union of Soviet Writers of Ukraine. In June 1941, just before the entry of the German troops, he evacuated from Lviv together with the Soviet troops deep into Russia. From 1941 to 1943, he lived in Tbilisi, where he taught mathematical analysis, and from 1943 in Moscow. He was active in the Union of Polish Patriots in the USSR.

Chwistek argued against the axiomatic method by demonstrating that the extant axiomatic systems are inconsistent. He was also, together with Jan Łukasiewicz, among the early pioneers of the use of the so‑called Polish notation in logic. In his correspondence with philosopher Wincenty Lutosławski, he criticized the Warsaw-Lwów School as "immature" and ascribed his choice of philosophical studies to Lutosławski's influence.

He died in 1944 in Barvikha near Moscow after a long illness. His ashes rest in a mass grave of the victims of Stalinist repressions at the Donskoye Cemetery in Moscow. Chwistek also has a symbolic grave at the Rakowicki Cemetery in Kraków.

== Artist ==
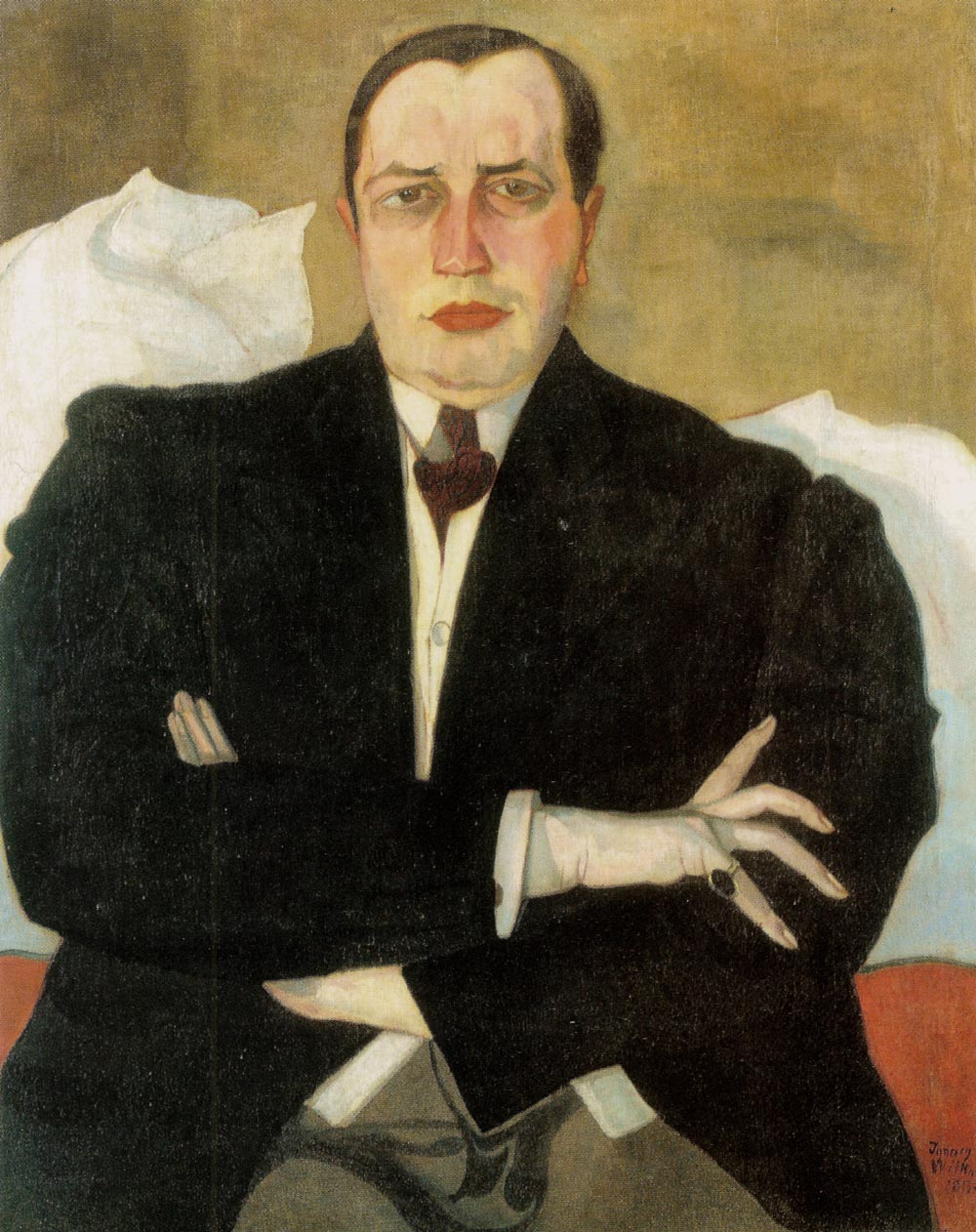
Portrait of Leon Chwistek by Witkacy, 1913

Between 1903 and 1904, Chwistek spent six months studying at the Kraków Academy of Fine Arts under Józef Mehoffer. A visit to Vienna in 1910 sparked his interest in Venetian painting. During his time in Paris in 1913–1914, he took drawing classes and first encountered Cubism. While in Paris, Chwistek took part in a duel at Place de la Concorde against painter Władysław Dunin-Borkowski who insulted his fiancée. The duel was won by Chwistek who wounded his opponent. In 1917, Chwistek helped establish the Kraków group known as the Polish Expressionists, later renamed the Formists in 1919, and soon became its principal theorist.

In 1935, the Łódź journal Forma (Form) printed a debate between Chwistek and Władysław Strzemiński, effectively setting Zonism against Unism. The discussion contrasted Chwistek’s vision of dynamic, life‑affirming art rooted in ideas of biological vitality with Strzemiński’s Constructivist approach, which emphasized intellectually driven and socially purposeful artistic practice.

Chwistek developed his theory of the multiplicity of realities first with regard to the arts. He distinguished four basic types of realities, then matched them with four basic types of painting.

The four types of realities were: popular reality (common-sense realism); physical reality (constructed by physics); phenomenal reality (sensory impressions); and visionary/intuitive reality (dreams, hallucinations, subconscious states). The types of painting corresponding to the aforemenitoned were: Primitivism; Realism; Impressionism; Futurism.

Chwistek never intended his views to constitute a new metaphysical theory. He was a defender of "common sense" against metaphysics and irrational feeling. His theory of plural reality was merely an attempt to specify the various ways in which the term, “real,” is used.

Chwistek's fellow artist and closest friend, Stanislaw Ignacy Witkiewicz, harshly criticized his philosophical views. Witkiewicz's own philosophy was based on a monadic character to the individual's existence, embracing a multiplicity of existences, with the world being made up of a multiplicity of Particular Existences. In his 1919 painting titled Fencing inspirations from avant-garde trends prior to World War I such as cubism, Italian futurism, and Robert Delaunay’s simultanism can be observed.

== Gallery ==
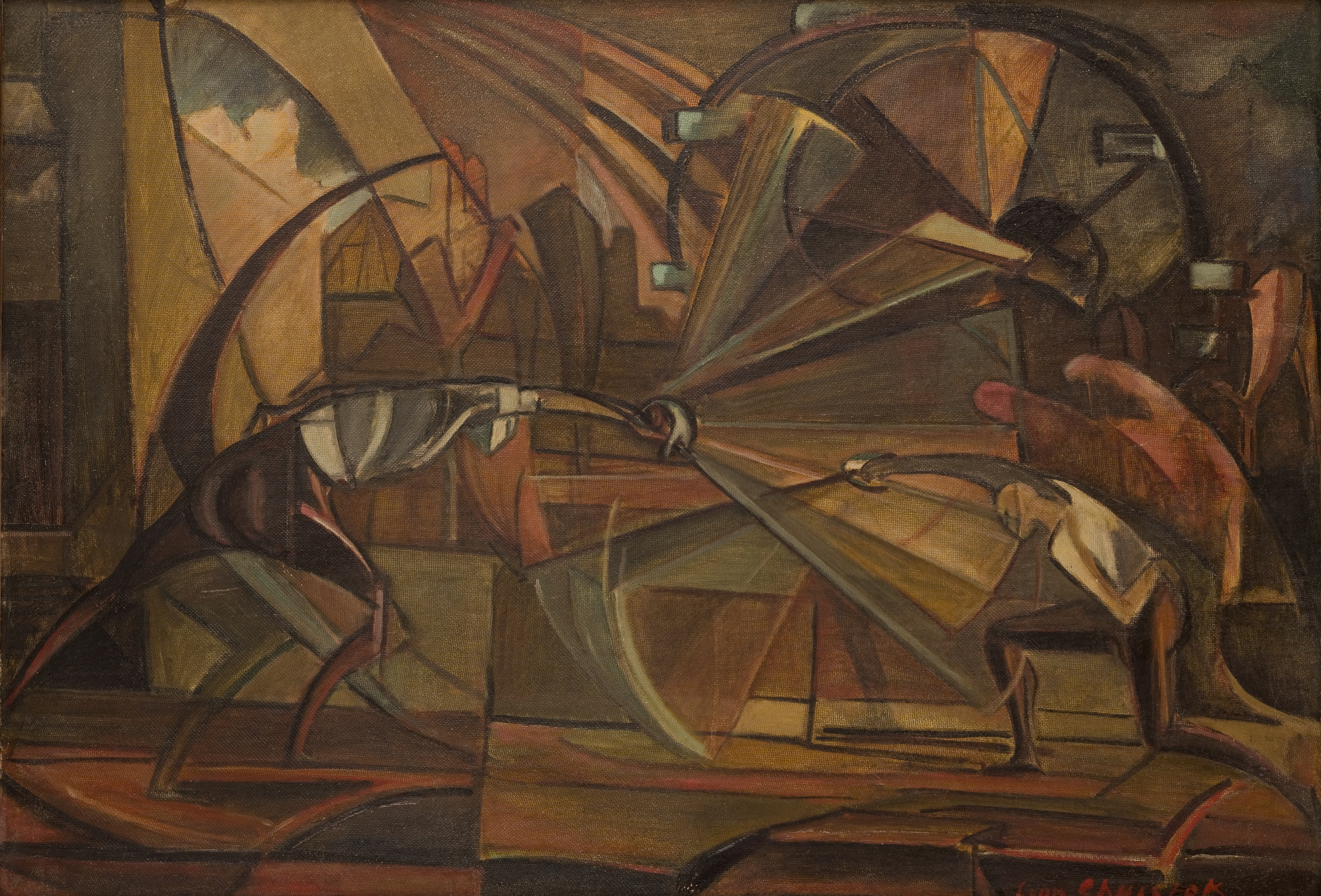
Fencing, 1919

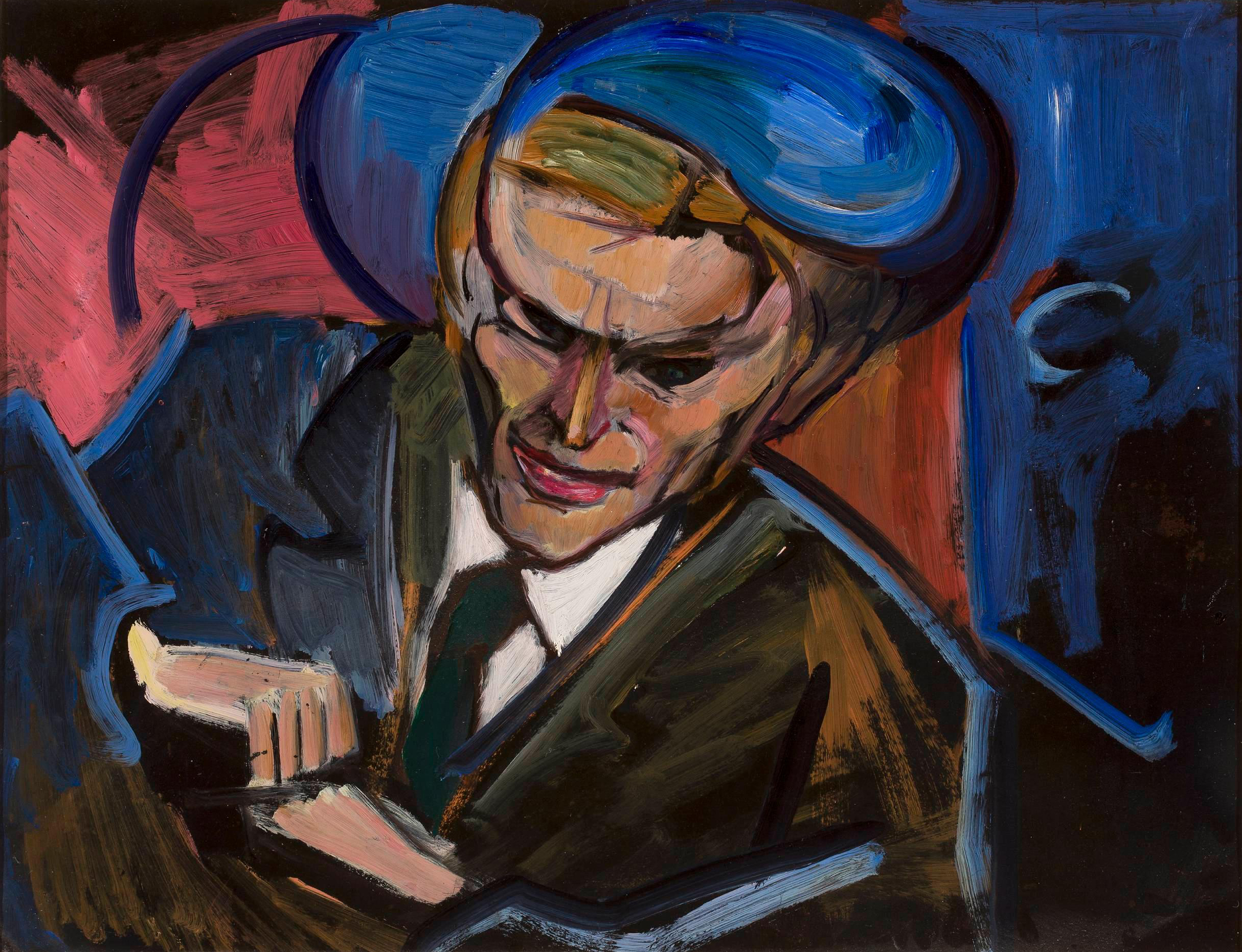
Portrait of Tytus Czyżewski, c.1920

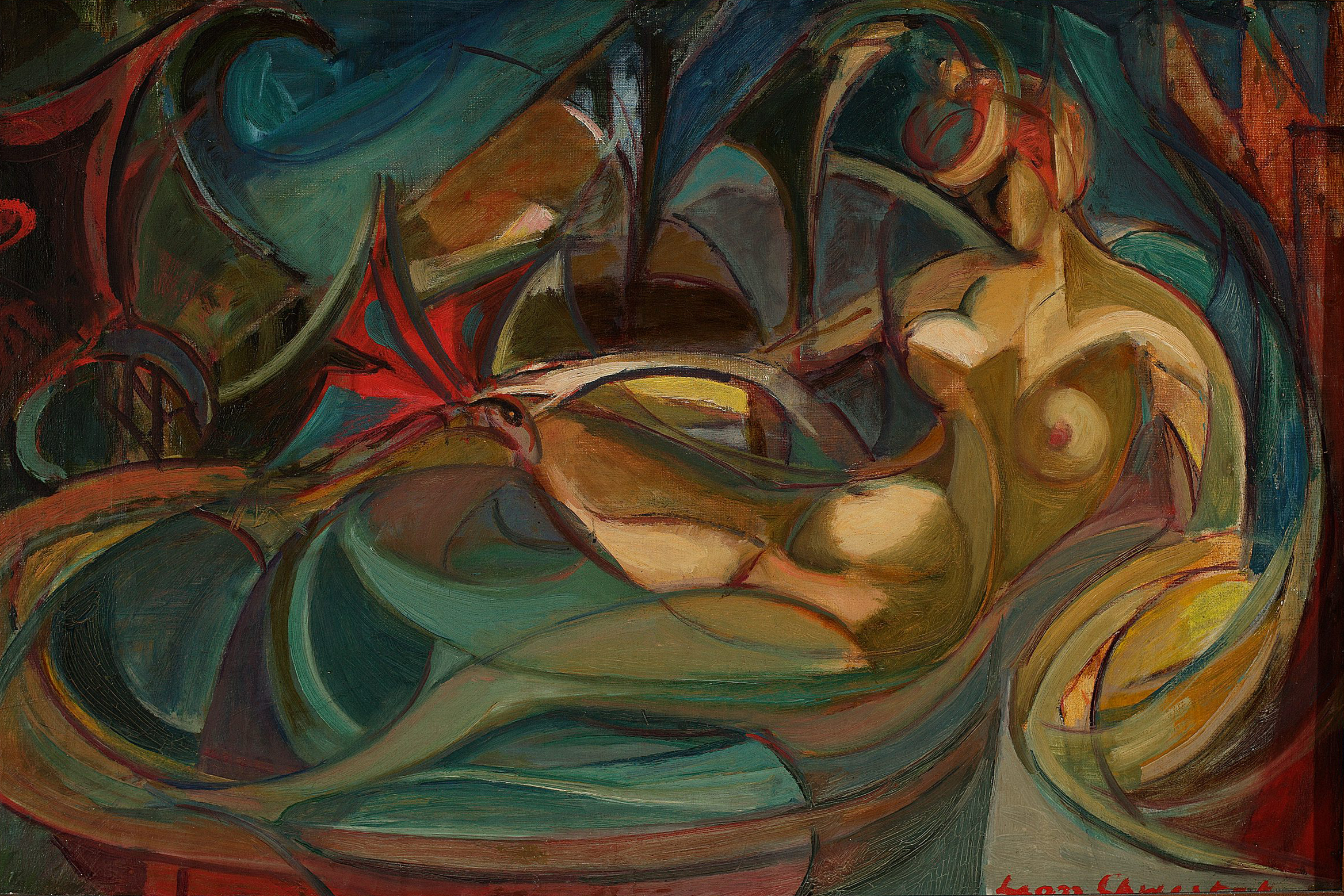
Female Nude – Butterflies, c.1920

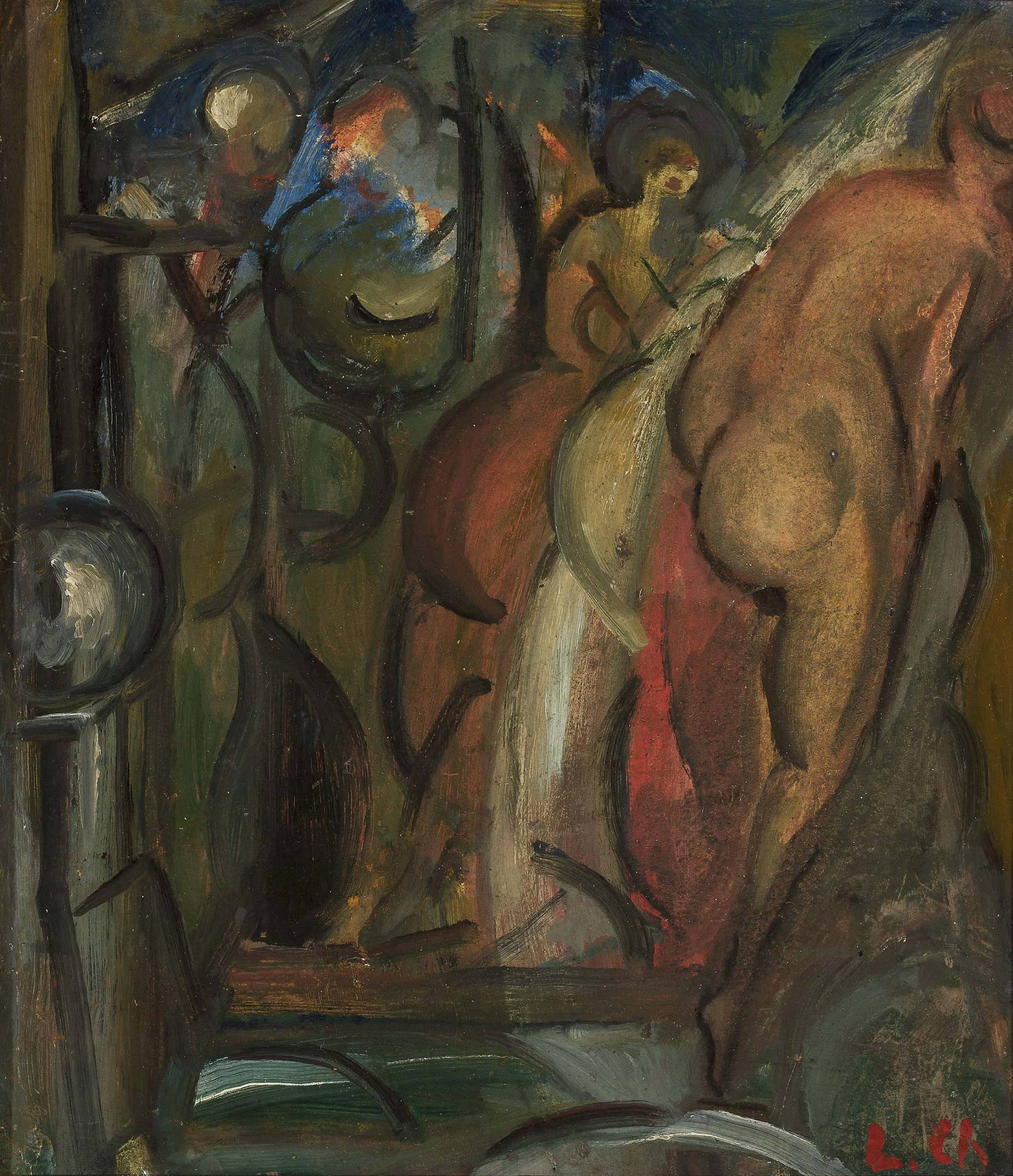
Bathers, c.1920

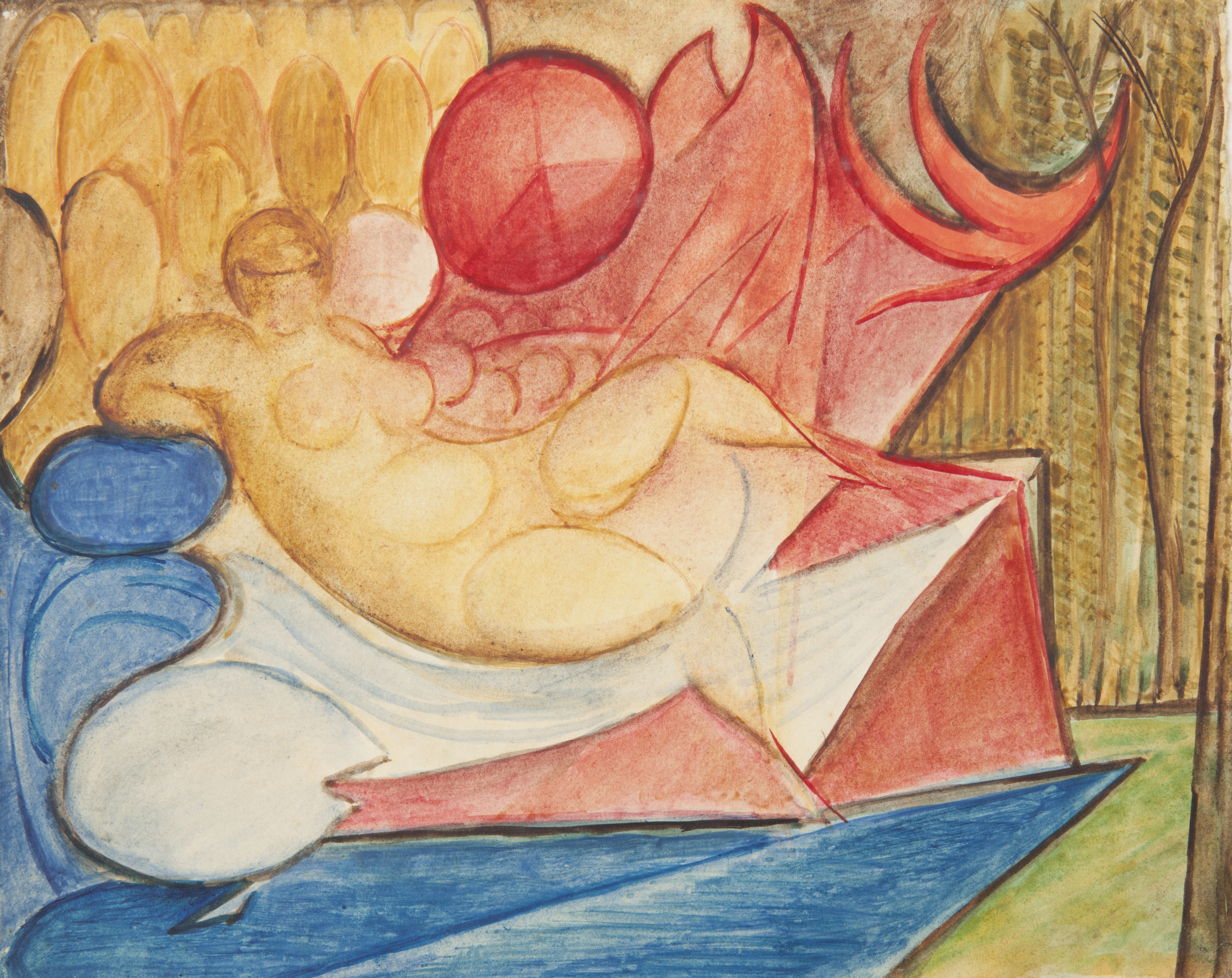
Reclining Female Nude, c.1922

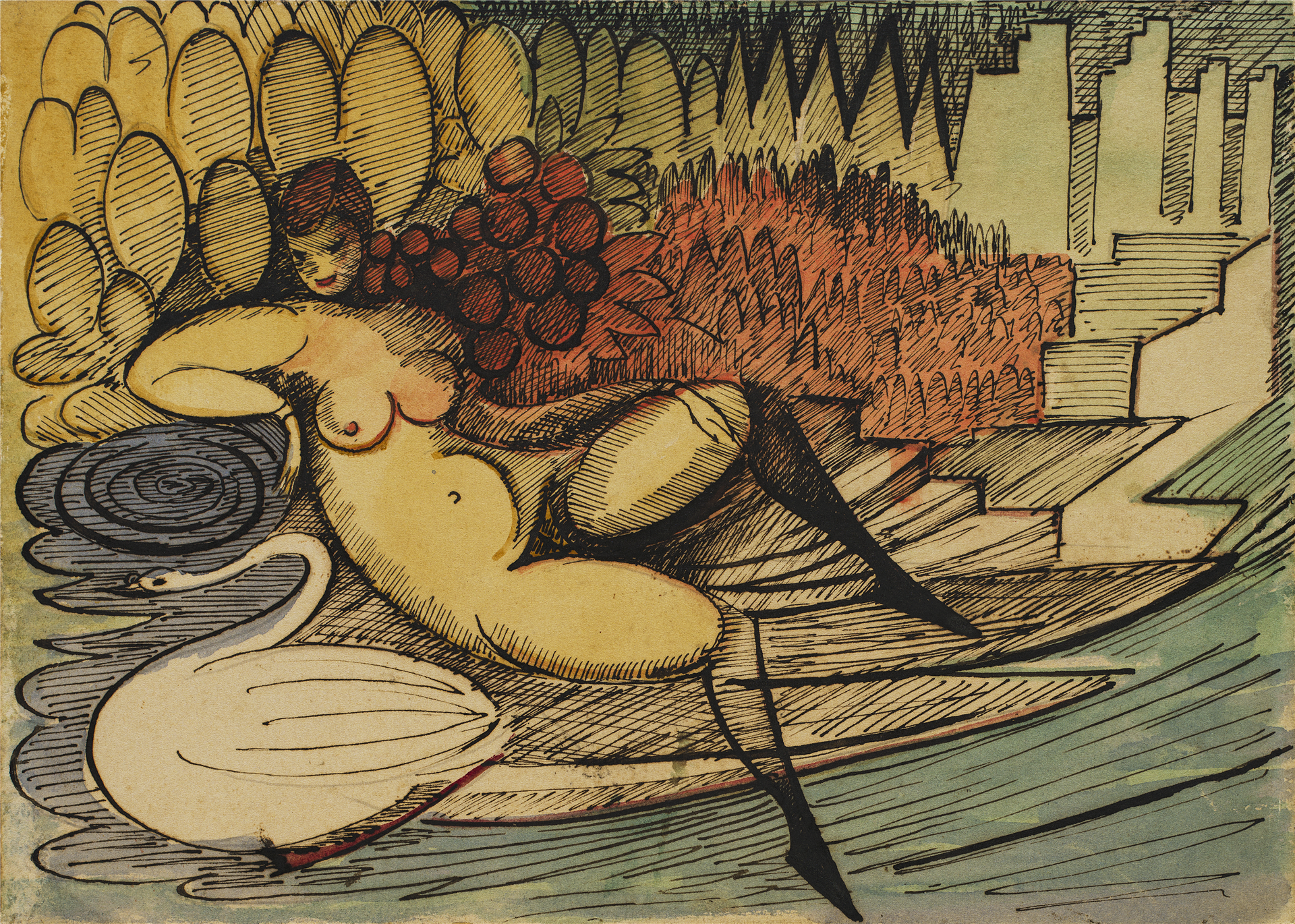
Leda, c.1925

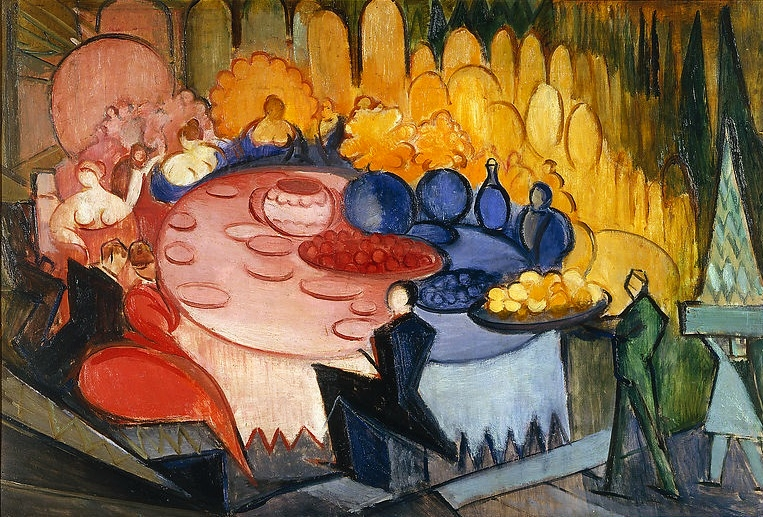
Feast, 1925

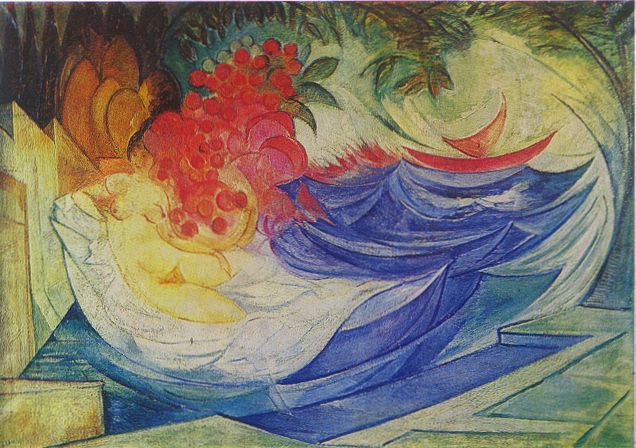
Venus, 1928

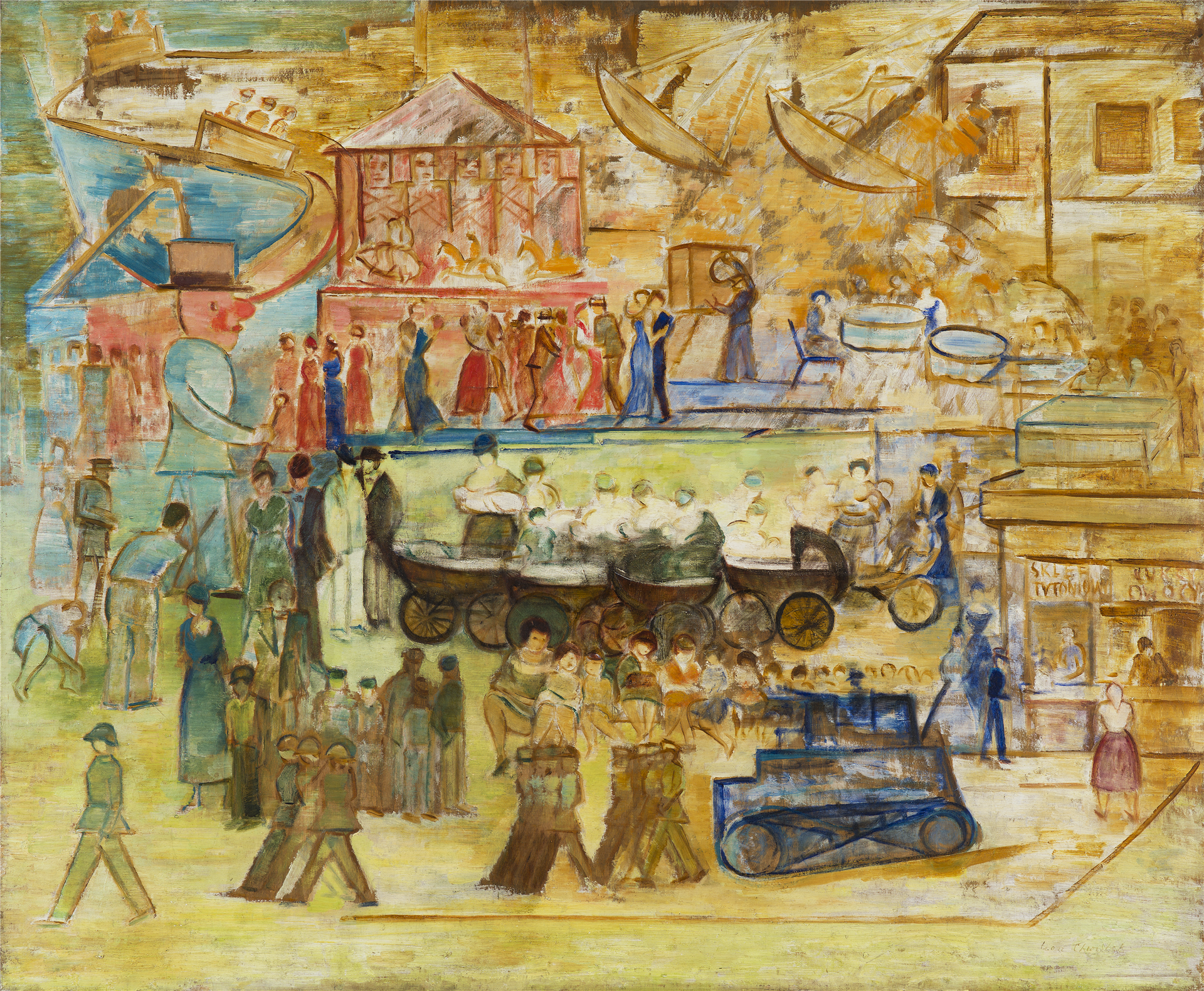
Carousel, 1936

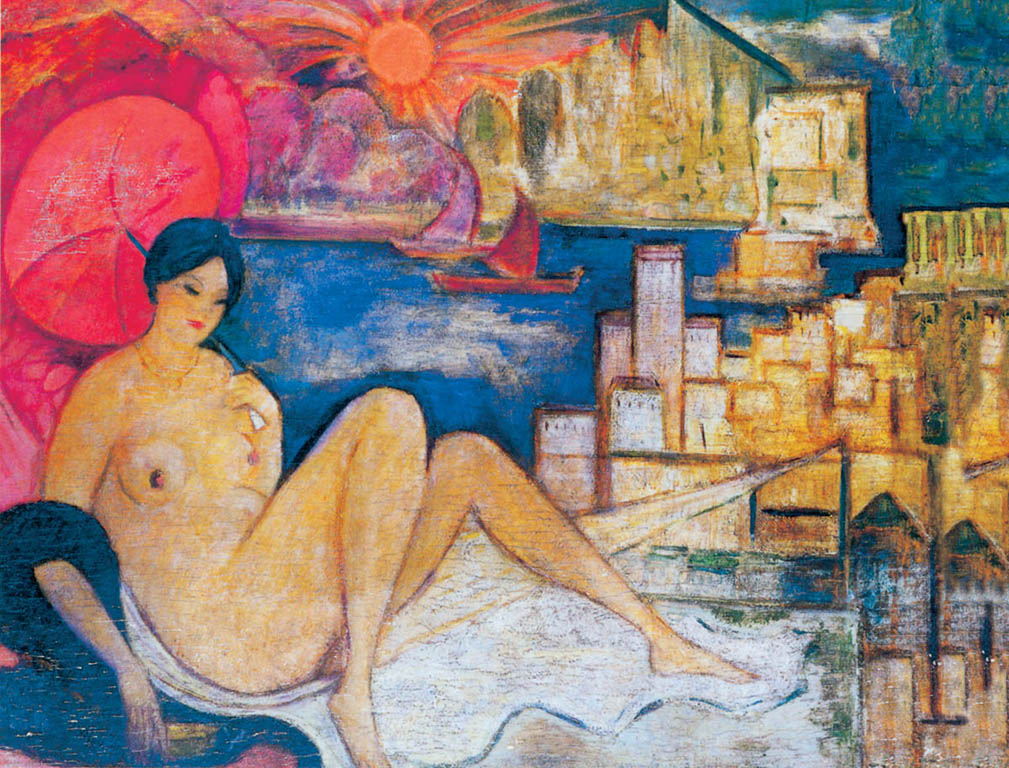
Nude, 1939

== Works ==
- The limits of science: Outline of logic and of the methodology of the exact sciences. Translated from the Polish by Helen Charlotte Brodie and Arthur P. Coleman; introduction and appendix by Helen Charlotte Brodie. New York: Harcourt, Brace, 1948.

== See also ==
- History of philosophy in Poland
- List of Poles
