= Edward Odell =

American mathematician

Edward "Ted" Wilfred Odell, Jr. (15 March 1947, in Pleasantville, New York – 9 January 2013, in Houston, Texas) was an American mathematician, specializing in the theory of Banach spaces.

Odell received in 1969 in his B.S. degree from the State University of New York at Binghamton and in 1975 his Ph.D. degree from the Massachusetts Institute of Technology under William Buhmann Johnson. From 1975 to 1977 Odell was a Josiah Willard Gibbs Instructor at Yale University. He became in 1977 an assistant professor, in 1981 an associate professor, and in 1990 a full professor at the University of Texas at Austin. He was the author or coauthor of 84 articles.

In 1994 Odell was an Invited Speaker of the ICM in Zurich. In 2012 he was elected a Fellow of the American Mathematical Society.

== Selected publications ==
- with W. B. Johnson: "Subspaces and quotients of l_{p}⊕l_{2} and X_{p}." Acta Mathematica 147, no. 1 (1981): 117–147. doi:10.1007/BF02392872
- with Richard Haydon and Mireille Levy: On sequences without weak* convergent convex block subsequences. Proc. Amer. Math. Soc. 100 (1987), 94–98 doi:10.1090/S0002-9939-1987-0883407-1
- with Thomas Schlumprecht : "The distortion problem." Acta Mathematica 173, no. 2 (1994): 259–281. doi:10.1007/BF02398436
- with Thomas Schlumprecht : Asymptotic properties of Banach spaces under renormings. J. Amer. Math. Soc. 11 (1998), 175–188 doi:10.1090/S0894-0347-98-00251-3
- with Thomas Schlumprecht: Trees and branches in Banach spaces. Trans. Amer. Math. Soc. 354 (2002), 4085–4108 doi:10.1090/S0002-9947-02-02984-7
- with Hans-Olav Tylli: Weakly compact approximation in Banach spaces. Trans. Amer. Math. Soc. 357 (2005), 1125–1159 doi:10.1090/S0002-9947-04-03684-0
- with B. Sari, Th. Schlumprecht, and B. Zheng: Systems formed by translates of one element in $L_{p}(\mathbb{R})$. Trans. Amer. Math. Soc. 363 (2011), 6505–6529 doi:10.1090/S0002-9947-2011-05305-5
