= Wiesław Żelazko =

Polish mathematician (1933–2025)

Wiesław Tadeusz Żelazko
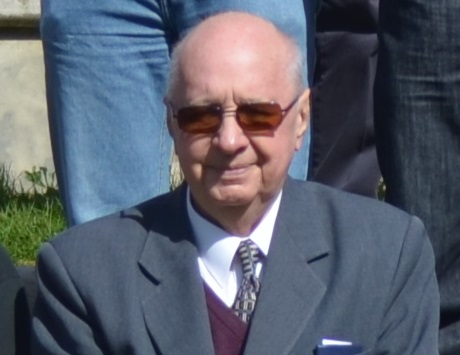
- Born: 16 February 1933; Łódź, Poland
- Died: 6 November 2025 (aged 92)
- Education: University of Warsaw
- Known for: Gleason–Kahane–Żelazko theorem; Hirschfeld–Żelazko theorem
- Awards
- Scientific career
- Fields: Functional analysis; topological algebras
- Workplaces: Institute of Mathematics, Polish Academy of Sciences
- Doctoral advisor: Stanisław Mazur
- Doctoral students: Zbigniew Słodkowski; Jaroslav Zemánek

Wiesław Tadeusz Żelazko (16 February 1933 – 6 November 2025) was a Polish mathematician who specialised in functional analysis and the theory of topological and Banach algebras. His name is attached to well-known theorems in Banach algebra theory, he held a full professorship at the Institute of Mathematics of the Polish Academy of Sciences, received major national and scientific awards, and served as president of the Polish Mathematical Society.

== Early life and education ==
Żelazko was born in Łódź, Poland on 16 February 1933. He was a finalist in the second Polish Mathematical Olympiad in 1951. He studied mathematics at the University of Warsaw, graduating in 1955 under the supervision of Roman Sikorski. He joined the Institute of Mathematics of the Polish Academy of Sciences (IMPAN) soon afterwards and completed his Ph.D. there in 1960 under Stanisław Mazur with a dissertation on locally bounded and m-convex rings.

== Academic career ==
Żelazko spent his entire professional career at IMPAN, where he became docent in 1965, extraordinary professor in 1971, and full professor in 1976. His research focused on the structure theory of topological algebras, automatic continuity, and spectral properties of Banach algebras.

He supervised several doctoral students, including Zbigniew Słodkowski and Jaroslav Zemánek, both of whom later became prominent researchers in operator theory and Banach algebras.

== Personal life and death ==
Żelazko was married to Jowita Koncewicz. He died on 6 November 2025, at the age of 92.

=== Legacy ===
A short note that several theorems bear his name and that his results remain standard references. Several theorems in functional analysis bear his name. The Gleason–Kahane–Żelazko theorem, independently obtained by three authors, provides a geometric characterization of multiplicative linear functionals and has since become a standard result in Banach algebra theory. The Hirschfeld–Żelazko theorem offers another spectral criterion that found broad use in automatic continuity problems.

== Professional service ==
Żelazko was a member of the Warsaw Scientific Society and of the Mathematics Committee of the Polish Academy of Sciences. From 1983 to 1985, he served as president of the Polish Mathematical Society.

== Awards and honours ==
Żelazko received the Stefan Banach Prize (1967) and the Stefan Banach Medal (2000). He was also decorated with the Knight's Cross of Polonia Restituta (1979), Officer's Cross (1988), and Commander's Cross (2009) of the Order of Polonia Restituta for his contributions to Polish science.

== Selected publications ==
- Żelazko, W. Locally bounded and m-convex rings (doctoral thesis), IMPAN, 1960.
- Jarosz, K.; Żelazko, W. Topological algebras and Banach algebras. In: Banach Center Publications, vol. 67 (2005), 9–20.
