= Adrian Świątek =

Polish footballer

Personal information
- Full name: Adrian Świątek
- Date of birth: 22 July 1986 (age 40)
- Place of birth: Poznań, Poland
- Height: 1.74 m (5 ft 8 1/2 in)
- Position: Forward

Team information
- Current team: Stella Luboń
- Number: 11

Youth career
- Warta Poznań

Senior career*
Years	Team	Apps	(Gls)
2003–2004	UKS SMS Łódź		
2005–2006	Stal Głowno		
2006–2010	ŁKS Łódź	33	(9)
2007	→ Piast Gliwice (loan)	1	(0)
2010–2012	Górnik Zabrze	22	(9)
2011	→ Ruch Radzionków (loan)	15	(4)
2011–2012	→ Piast Gliwice (loan)	25	(4)
2012–2013	Sandecja Nowy Sącz	12	(1)
2013–2014	Pelikan Łowicz	26	(7)
2014–2015	Formacja Port 2000 Mostki	30	(23)
2015–2016	Drwęca Nowe Miasto Lubawskie	19	(11)
2016	ŁKS Łódź	8	(3)
2016–2017	Polonia Środa Wielkopolska	13	(4)
2017	FC Inter Dragon	6	(7)
2017–2018	Schleswig 06	25	(16)
2019	Orkan Jarosławiec	3	(6)
2019	Lotnik Poznań	4	(5)
2020–2021	Schleswig 06		
2021	FSG Ostseeküste		
2021	Jurand Koziegłowy	6	(6)
2022	Wiara Lecha Poznań II	5	(5)
2023–	Stella Luboń	43	(46)
- * Club domestic league appearances and goals as of 13:29, 25 June 2025 (UTC)

Adrian Świątek (born 22 July 1986) is a Polish footballer who plays as a forward for Stella Luboń.

== Career ==
=== Club ===
In the past, he played for UKS SMS Łódź, Stal Głowno, ŁKS Łódź and Piast Gliwice.

In February 2010, he signed a three-year contract with Górnik Zabrze.

In February 2011, he was loaned to Ruch Radzionków on a half-year deal.

On 20 July 2020, he returned to German Verbandsliga Schleswig-Holstein-Ost amateur side Schleswig 06. In 2021, he played for German Club FSG Ostseeküste.

== Honours ==
Piast Gliwice

- I liga: 2011–12

Formacja Port 2000 Mostki

- III liga Lower Silesia–Lubusz: 2014–15

Stella Luboń

- Regional league Greater Poland III: 2024–25
