= Aleksander Pełczyński =

Polish mathematician (1932–2012

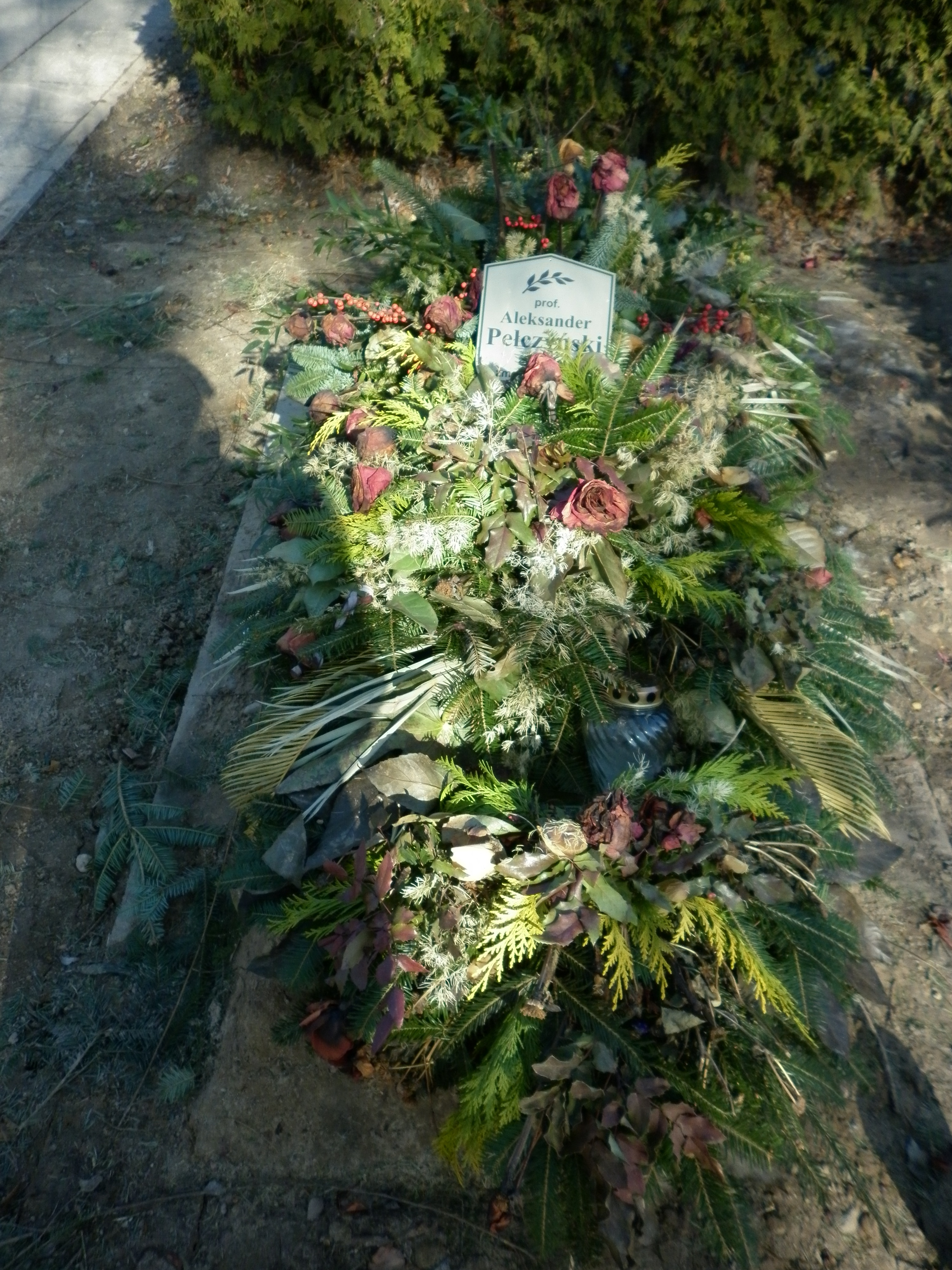
Pełczyński's grave in Warsaw

Aleksander "Olek" Pełczyński (2 July 1932, Tarnopol, Poland – 20 December 2012, Wrocław) was a Polish mathematician who worked in functional analysis.

== Career ==
Pełczyński studied mathematics from 1950 to 1956 at the University of Warsaw and received there his doctorate in 1958 under Stanisław Mazur with dissertation Własności izomorficzne przestrzeni Banacha związane ze słabą zbieżnością bezwarunkową szeregów (Isomorphic properties of Banach spaces with regard to unconditional convergence of series). From 1967 to 2002 he worked at the Polish Academy of Sciences.

From 1967 onwards, he was a member of the editorial staff of the journal Studia Mathematica.

His doctoral students include Nicole Tomczak-Jaegermann and Stanisław Szarek.

He died in December 2012 and was buried in Warsaw.

== Research ==
Pełczyński's main field of research was functional analysis, especially the theory of Banach spaces. The Bessaga–Pełczyński selection principle and the Pełczyński decomposition method are associated with his name.

== Awards and honors ==
Pełczyński received the Stefan Banach Prize in 1961. In 1983, he became the recipient of the Sierpiński Medal awarded jointly by the Polish Mathematical Society and the University of Warsaw. In 1986, he was elected a member of the Akademie der Wissenschaften der DDR. He received the Stefan Banach Medal of the Polish Academy of Sciences in 1996. In 2005, he was granted an honorary doctorate from the Adam Mickiewicz University in Poznań.

In 1966, Pełczyński was (with Boris Mityagin) an invited speaker at the International Congress of Mathematicians in Moscow. In 1983, he was a plenary speaker at the International Congress of Mathematicians in Warsaw and gave the talk Structural Theory of Banach Spaces and Its Interplay with Analysis and Probability.
