= William B. Johnson (mathematician) =

American mathematician

William Buhmann Johnson (born December 5, 1944) is an American mathematician, one of the namesakes of the Johnson–Lindenstrauss lemma. He is Distinguished Professor and A.G. & M.E. Owen Chair of Mathematics at Texas A&M University. His research specialties include the theory of Banach spaces, nonlinear functional analysis, and probability theory. He was born in Palo Alto, California and raised from an early age in Dallas, Texas.

Johnson graduated from Southern Methodist University in 1966, and earned a doctorate from Iowa State University in 1969 under the supervision of James A. Dyer. After faculty positions at the University of Houston, and Ohio State University, he joined the Texas A&M faculty in 1984.

In 2007, Johnson was awarded the Stefan Banach Medal of the Polish Academy of Sciences. In 2012 he became a fellow of the American Mathematical Society. In 2018 he was an Invited Speaker at the International Congress of Mathematicians in Rio de Janeiro. His doctoral students include Edward Odell.
