= Thomas Kappeler =

Swiss mathematician (1953–2022)

Thomas Kappeler (12 February 1953 – 30 May 2022) was a Swiss mathematician and professor at the University of Zurich. Kappeler's main research was in global analysis, partial differential equations and dynamical systems in infinite dimensions.

Kappeler co-founded the Zurich Graduate School in Mathematics, a joint doctoral program of the Mathematics departments of ETH Zurich and University of Zurich. He also actively supported young kids with talent in mathematics. He was the co-leader of the children's math club Junior Euler Society.

== Life ==
Kappeler studied mathematics at ETH Zurich, where he did his Ph.D. in 1981 under the supervision of Corneliu Constantinescu. He was a visiting professor at the University of California, Berkeley, the University of Pennsylvania, Brandeis University and Brown University. He was a professor at Ohio State University from 1990 till 1996. After that he became a mathematics professor at University of Zurich.

== Selected publications ==
Kappeler published more than 150 research articles. He also published two books on partial differential equations.

- Craig, Walter; Kappeler, Thomas; Strauss, Walter (1995). "Microlocal dispersive smoothing for the Schrödinger equation". Communications on Pure and Applied Mathematics. 48 (8): 769–860. doi:10.1002/cpa.3160480802.
- Burghelea, Dan; Friedlander, Leonid; Kappeler, Thomas (1992). "Mayer-Vietoris type formula for determinants of elliptic differential operators". Journal of Functional Analysis. 107 (1): 34–65. doi:10.1016/0022-1236(92)90099-5.
- Kappeler, Thomas; Perry, Peter A.; Shubin, Mikhail A.; Topalov, Peter (2005). "The Miura map on the line" (PDF). International Mathematics Research Notices. 2005 (50): 3091–3133. arXiv:math/0506411. doi:10.1155/IMRN.2005.3091. S2CID 9065483.
- Kappeler, Thomas; Topalov, Peter (1 November 2006). "Global wellposedness of KdV in H−1(T,R)". Duke Mathematical Journal. 135 (2): 327–360. doi:10.1215/S0012-7094-06-13524-X.
- Kappeler, Thomas; Pöschel, Jürgen (2009). "On the periodic KdV equation in weighted Sobolev spaces". Annales de l'Institut Henri Poincaré C. 26 (3): 841–853. Bibcode:2009AIHPC..26..841K. doi:10.1016/j.anihpc.2008.03.004.
- Henrici, Andreas; Kappeler, Thomas (2009). "Nekhoroshev theorem for the periodic Toda lattice". Chaos. 19 (3): 033120. arXiv:0812.4912. Bibcode:2009Chaos..19c3120H. doi:10.1063/1.3196783. PMID 19792000. S2CID 18290712.
- Cohen, Daniel C.; Costa, Armindo; Farber, Michael; Kappeler, Thomas (2012). "Topology of Random 2-Complexes". Discrete & Computational Geometry. 47 (1): 117–149. arXiv:1006.4229. doi:10.1007/s00454-011-9378-0. MR 2886093. S2CID 254038254.

=== Books ===
- Kappeler, Thomas; Pöschel, Jürgen (2003). KdV & KAM. doi:10.1007/978-3-662-08054-2. ISBN 978-3-540-02234-3.
- Grébert, Benoît; Kappeler, Thomas (2014). The Defocusing NLS Equation and Its Normal Form. doi:10.4171/131. ISBN 978-3-03719-131-6.
