= Michał Misiurewicz =

Polish mathematician

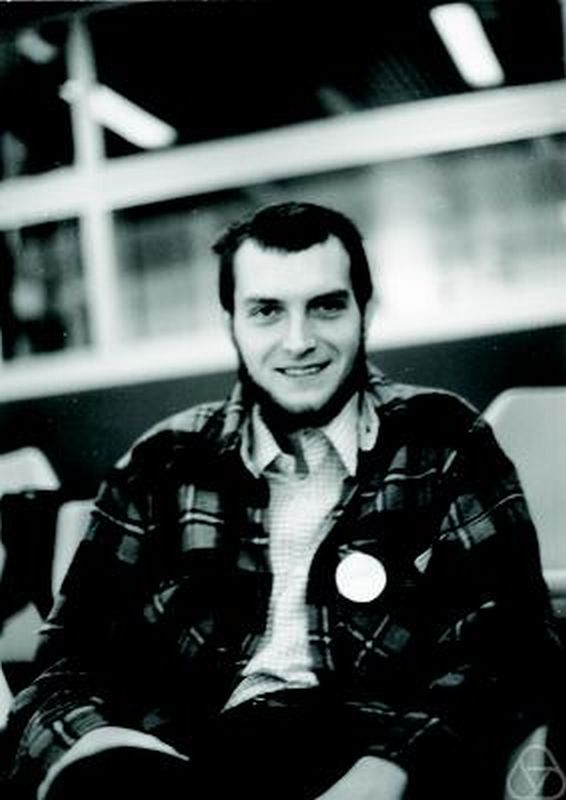
- Misiurewicz in 1975
- Born: 9 November 1948 (age 77); Warsaw, Poland
- Citizenship: Poland; USA
- Education: University of Warsaw
- Known for: Misiurewicz point
- Scientific career
- Fields: Mathematics
- Workplaces: University of Warsaw; IUPUI
- Doctoral advisor: Bogdan Bojarski

Michał Misiurewicz (born 9 November 1948) is a Polish mathematician. He is known for his contributions to chaotic dynamical systems and fractal geometry, notably the Misiurewicz point.

Misiurewicz participated in the International Mathematical Olympiad for Poland, winning a bronze medal in 1965 and a gold medal (with perfect score and special prize) in 1966. He earned his Doctorate from University of Warsaw under supervision of Bogdan Bojarski.

In 1990, he moved to the United States, where he visited Northwestern University and Princeton University, eventually settling down at Indiana University–Purdue University Indianapolis at Indianapolis, Indiana, where he currently is a professor. In 2003, Misiurewicz became the recipient of the Sierpiński Medal conferred jointly by the Polish Mathematical Society and the University of Warsaw.

In 2012, he became a fellow of the American Mathematical Society.

== See also ==
- Mandelbrot set
- Complex quadratic polynomial
- Conley index theory
- Topological entropy
- Rotation number
- Rule 90
