= Roman Świątkiewicz =

Roman Świątkiewicz, pen name Roman Świątek, or Romuald Świątek-Horyń (born May 20, 1928), is a Polish writer, war veteran and World War II amateur historian. He published two controversial books about his personal experiences, Przed czerwonym trybunałem in 1987 in London (re-issued in Poland in 1990) and The Katyn Forest in 1988 in London under the pseudonym of "Romuald Swiatek". In the books he blamed the Germans for the Katyn massacre. In his second book he also claimed that Gerhard Buhtz, the leader of the German Katyn Commission in 1943 was killed by the Germans in 1944.

Świątkiewicz spent seven years in Soviet labor camps in 1950–1956, where he met several hundred of German POWs, who told him that they had seen Polish POW camps in Nazi occupied territories. In the preface to his book The Katyn Forest he wrote:

I hope that following will clarify my reasons for writing this book. When, in 1950, I found myself in Soviet labour camps, amongst German prisoners of war, Polish underground army members, some of Vlasov's men and Bandera's men, where the crime of Katyn was frequently and hotly discussed. I developed, quite when I know not, a deeper interest in the subject and, with the passage of time and influenced by material I had gathered, I began to see that the version of the Katyn crime given in 1943 by Polish exile groups in London had no real foundation.

During my seven-year stay in the camps, I met many German officers who, in 1941, were occupying the territories of Smolensk and saw, with their own eyes camps with Polish officers. I also met in the camps several residents of Smolensk whose statements finally confirmed my conviction that some Polish exile groups in London, /Sanacja/ took advantage of the discovery by Germans of the mass graves of Polish officers to use it as a political weapon against General Sikorski, whose policy towards the Soviet Union, as, indeed, his very person, was to them, total anathema.

After meeting a Polish POW – an officer from Kraków named Władysław Zak – who told him that he was transferred from a NKVD camp near Smolensk to a jail in Moscow just two weeks before the German attack on Soviet Union, Świątkiewicz became completely convinced that the Germans had committed the massacre in Katyn.

Świątkiewicz also complained that when he came to London in 1968, with the intention to publish his first book, his attitude did not win the sympathy of the Polish exile circles. The publisher of the book demanded that he dropped the controversial chapter.

Despite Russian officials admitting in 1990 that the massacre was committed in the spring of 1940 by NKVD on Beria's order, Świątkiewicz continued to believe that the Polish officers were murdered by Germans. He also claimed that Russia in 1990 was forced by Polish government to confirm what he believed was the false version of the events.

== Bibliography ==
- Romuald Świątkiewicz, Przed czerwonym trybunałem, Otton Hulacki, 1987. 164 pp. ISBN 978-0-948638-01-5. (Re-issued in 1990. Białystok, Białostockie Wydawnictwo Prasowe. 143 pp.)
- Romuald Świątek-Horyń, The Katyn Forest. London. Panda Press, 1988. 106 pp. ISBN 1-870078-30-6
