= Zbigniew Ciesielski =

Polish mathematician (1934–2020)

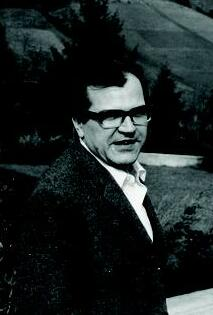
- Ciesielski in 1976
- Born: 1 October 1934; Gdynia, Poland
- Died: 5 October 2020 (aged 86); Sopot, Poland
- Education: Adam Mickiewicz University in Poznań
- Known for: Research on Schauder bases in Banach spaces probability theory Ciesielski's isomorphism
- Awards: Stefan Banach Prize (1964)
- Scientific career
- Fields: Functional analysis probability theory
- Workplaces: University of Gdańsk; Polish Academy of Sciences

Zbigniew Ciesielski (Polish pronunciation: [ˈzbiɡɲɛf t͡ɕɛˈɕɛlskʲi]; 1 October 1934 – 5 October 2020) was a Polish mathematician specializing in functional analysis and probability theory. He served as the President of the Polish Mathematical Society from 1981 to 1983.

== Education and career ==
Ciesielski was born in Gdynia, Poland. He received in 1960 his doctorate from the Adam Mickiewicz University in Poznan with dissertation O rozwinięciach ortogonalnych prawie wszystkich funkcji w przestrzeni Wienera (On orthogonal developments of almost all functions in Wiener space) under the supervision of Władysław Orlicz.

He has been a professor at the Mathematical Institute of the Polish Academy of Sciences since 1969 and a member of the Academy since 1973. In 1974 he was an Invited Speaker of the International Congress of Mathematicians in Vancouver. He was President of the Polish Mathematical Society from 1981 to 1983.

Ciesielski's main areas of research are functional analysis, in particular Schauder bases in Banach spaces, and probability theory, in particular the mathematical theory of Brownian motion.

== Awards and decorations ==
- 1964: Stefan Banach Prize
- 1974: Order of Polonia Restituta: Knight's Cross
- 1984: Order of Polonia Restituta: Officer's Cross
- 1992: Stefan Banach Medal
- 1988: Polish State Award of 1st degree
- 2000: Sierpiński Medal awarded by the Polish Mathematical Society and the University of Warsaw
- 2004: Honorary Member of the Polish Mathematical Society
- 2014: Honorary degree of the University of Gdańsk

== See also ==
- List of Polish mathematicians
