= Polish Mathematical Society =

Society of Polish mathematicians

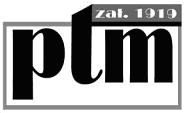
- Formation: April 2, 1919
- Headquarters: ul. Śniadeckich 8, 00-956 Warszawa, Poland
- Location: Poland
- Official language: Polish, English
- President: Jacek Miękisz
- Key people: Tomasz Downarowicz, Klaudiusz Wójcik, Krystyna Jaworska, Piotr Kowalczyk, Leokadia Białas-Cież, Małgorzata Makiewicz, Dorota Mozyrska, Jan Poleszczuk
- Website: http://www.ptm.org.pl/

The Polish Mathematical Society (Polish: Polskie Towarzystwo Matematyczne) is the main professional society of Polish mathematicians and represents Polish mathematics within the European Mathematical Society (EMS) and the International Mathematical Union (IMU).

== History ==
The society was established in Kraków, Poland on 2 April 1919 . It was originally called the Mathematical Society in Kraków, the name was changed to the Polish Mathematical Society on 21 April 1920. It was founded by 16 mathematicians, Stanisław Zaremba, Franciszek Leja, Jan Śleszyński, Alfred Rosenblatt, Stefan Banach, Otto Nikodym, Kazimierz Żorawski and Leon Chwistek were among them.

Ever since its foundation, the society's main activity was to bring mathematicians together by means of organizing conferences and lectures. The second main activity is the publication of its annals Annales Societatis Mathematicae Polonae, consisting of:

- Series 1: Commentationes Mathematicae
- Series 2: Wiadomości Matematyczne ("Mathematical News"), in Polish
- Series 3: Mathematica Applicanda (formerly Matematyka Stosowana until 2012)
- Series 4: Fundamenta Informaticae
- Series 5: Didactica Mathematicae
- Series 6: Antiquitates Mathematicae
- Series 7: Delta, in Polish

The annals are also known under the Polish name Roczniki Polskiego Towarzystwa Matematycznego and under the English name Polish Mathematical Society Annals.

== Stefan Banach Prize ==
The Polish Mathematical Society has awarded the Stefan Banach Prize to the following recipients:

- 1946: Hugo Steinhaus and Wacław Sierpiński
- 1947: Mieczysław Biernacki
- 1948: Władysław Orlicz
- 1949: Stanisław Mazur
- 1950: Jan Mikusiński
- 1951: Adam Bielecki
- 1952: Andrzej Alexiewicz
- 1953: Stanisław Hartman
- 1954: Tadeusz Leżański
- 1955: Witold Wolibner
- 1956: Zofia Szmydt
- 1957: Andrzej Grzegorczyk
- 1958: Mieczysław Altman
- 1959: Józef Meder
- 1960: Krzysztof Maurin
- 1961: Czesław Bessaga and Aleksander Pełczyński
- 1962: Edward Sąsiada
- 1963: Bogdan Bojarski
- 1964: Zbigniew Ciesielski
- 1965: Jan Mycielski
- 1966: Włodzimierz Mlak
- 1967: Wiesław Żelazko
- 1968: Władysław Narkiewicz
- 1969: Danuta Przeworska-Rolewicz and Stefan Rolewicz
- 1970: Roman Duda
- 1971: Stanisław Kwapień
- 1972: Andrzej Pelczar
- 1973: Adam Henryk Toruńczyk
- 1974: Leszek Pacholski
- 1976: Tadeusz Figiel
- 1977: Lech Drewnowski
- 1979: Przemysław Wojtaszczyk
- 1982: Lech Maligranda
- 1983: Tomasz Byczkowski
- 1984: Marek Bożejko
- 1985: Wojciech Banaszczak
- 1986: Henryk Hudzik
- 1987: Jarosław Zemanek
- 1988: Adam Paszkiewicz
- 1990: Marek Lassak
- 1991: Paweł Domański
- 1992: Marek Nawrocki
- 1993: Ryszard Szwarc
- 1997: Mariusz Lemańczyk
- 2001: Mieczysław Mastyło
- 2002: Rafał Latała and Krzysztof Oleszkiewicz
- 2003: Jerzy Jezierski and Wacław Marzantowicz
- 2007: Grzegorz Świątek
- 2008: Lech Tadeusz Januszkiewicz
- 2009: Tomasz Downarowicz
- 2010: Adam Paszkiewicz
- 2011: Tomasz Komorowski
- 2012: Jacek Świątkowski
- 2013: Henryk Woźniakowski
- 2014: Krzysztof Frączek
- 2015: Jan Okniński
- 2016: Adrian Langer
- 2017: Krzysztof Bogdan
- 2018: Wojciech Kucharz and Maksym Radziwill
- 2019: Yuriy Tomilov
- 2020: Jerzy Weyman
- 2021: Damian Osajda
- 2022: Piotr W. Nowak
- 2023: Mariusz Mirek
- 2024: Mikołaj Frączyk, Adam Kanigowski
- 2025: Jacek Jendrej

== International Stefan Banach Prize ==
The International Stefan Banach Prize (Polish: Międzynarodowa Nagroda im. Stefana Banacha) is an annual award presented by the Mathematical Society to mathematicians for best doctoral dissertations in the mathematical sciences. Its aim is to "promote and financially support the most promising young researchers" in the field of mathematics. It was founded in 2009 and is named in honour of a renowned Polish mathematician Stefan Banach (1892-1945). The laureates of the award also receive a cash prize of zl 25,000 (c.$6,500). List of laureates:

- 2009: Tomasz Elsner
- 2010: Jakub Gismatullin
- 2011: Łukasz Pańkowski
- 2012: Andras Mathe
- 2013: Marcin Pilipczuk
- 2014: Dan Petersen
- 2015: Joonas Ilmavirta
- 2016: Adam Kanigowski
- 2017: Anna Szymusiak
- 2018-2020: No Award
- 2021: Michał Miśkiewicz
- 2022: Marcin Sroka
- 2024: Dalimil Peša
- 2025: Feliks Rączka
- 2026: Katarzyna Kowalik

== Sierpiński Medal ==
The Sierpiński Medal (Polish: Medal im. Wacława Sierpińskiego) is an annual award presented jointly by the Polish Mathematical Society and the University of Warsaw for outstanding scientific contributions by mathematicians with connections to Poland. Named in honour of Wacław Sierpiński, the award was first conferred in 1974 and presented to Kazimierz Kuratowski. The laureates traditionally deliver the Wacław Sierpiński Lecture on the day of receiving the medal. List of laureates:

- 2025: Wiesława Nizioł
- 2024: Jarosław Wiśniewski
- 2023: Mariusz Urbański
- 2022: Mariusz Lemańczyk
- 2021: Piotr Hajłasz
- 2020: Feliks Przytycki
- 2019: Maciej Zworski
- 2018: Tomasz Łuczak
- 2017: Stanisław Szarek
- 2016: Adam Henryk Toruńczyk
- 2015: Jerzy Weyman
- 2014: Maciej P. Wojtkowski
- 2013: Nicole Tomczak-Jaegermann
- 2012: Jerzy Kaczorowski
- 2011: Krzysztof Burdzy
- 2010: S. L. Woronowicz
- 2009: Tadeusz Iwaniec
- 2008: Stanisław Kwapień
- 2007: Krystyna Kuperberg
- 2006: Jerzy Zabczyk
- 2005: Benoit Mandelbrot
- 2004: Józef Siciak
- 2003: Michał Misiurewicz
- 2002: Andrzej Lasota
- 2001: Wolfgang M. Schmidt
- 2000: Zbigniew Ciesielski
- 1999: Andrzej Białynicki-Birula
- 1998: Bob Oliver
- 1997: Czesław Bessaga
- 1996: Henryk Iwaniec
- 1995: Yuri Mikhailovich Smirnov
- 1994: Ryszard Engelking
- 1993: Kazimierz Urbanik
- 1992: Paul Erdős
- 1991: Samuel Eilenberg
- 1990: Jan Mycielski
- 1989: Stanisław Hartman
- 1988: Jens Erik Fenstad
- 1987: Helena Rasiowa
- 1986: Jerzy Łoś
- 1985: Jan Mikusiński
- 1984: Stanisław Łojasiewicz
- 1983: Aleksander Pełczyński
- 1982: Andrzej Schinzel
- 1981: not awarded
- 1980: not awarded
- 1979: Władysław Orlicz
- 1978: Stanisław Ulam
- 1977: not awarded
- 1976: Karol Borsuk
- 1975: Antoni Zygmund
- 1974: Kazimierz Kuratowski

== Presidents of the Polish Mathematical Society ==
- Stanisław Zaremba (1919–1921, 1936–1937)
- Wiktor Staniewicz (1921–1923)
- Samuel Dickstein (1923–1926)
- Zdzisław Krygowski (1926–1928)
- Wacław Sierpiński (1928–1930)
- Kazimierz Bartel (1930–1932)
- Stefan Mazurkiewicz (1932–1936, 1937–1939)
- Stefan Banach (1939–1945)
- Karol Borsuk (1946)
- Kazimierz Kuratowski (1946–1953)
- Stefan Straszewicz (1953–1957)
- Edward Marczewski (1957–1959)
- Tadeusz Ważewski (1959–1961)
- Władysław Ślebodziński (1961–1963)
- Franciszek Leja (1963–1965)
- Roman Sikorski (1965–1977)
- Władysław Orlicz (1977–1979)
- Jacek Szarski (1979–1981)
- Zbigniew Ciesielski (1981–1983)
- Wiesław Żelazko (1983–1985)
- Stanisław Balcerzyk (1985–1987)
- Andrzej Pelczar (1987–1991)
- Julian Musielak (1991–1993)
- Kazimierz Goebel (1993–1999)
- Bolesław Szafirski (1999–2003)
- Zbigniew Palka (2003–2005)
- Stefan Jackowski (2005–2013)
- Wacław Marzantowicz (2014–2019)
- Jacek Miękisz (since 2020)

== See also ==
- European Mathematical Society
- Polish Chemical Society
- Polish Physical Society
- Kuratowski Prize
