= Jerzy Broszkiewicz =

Polish writer (1922–1993)

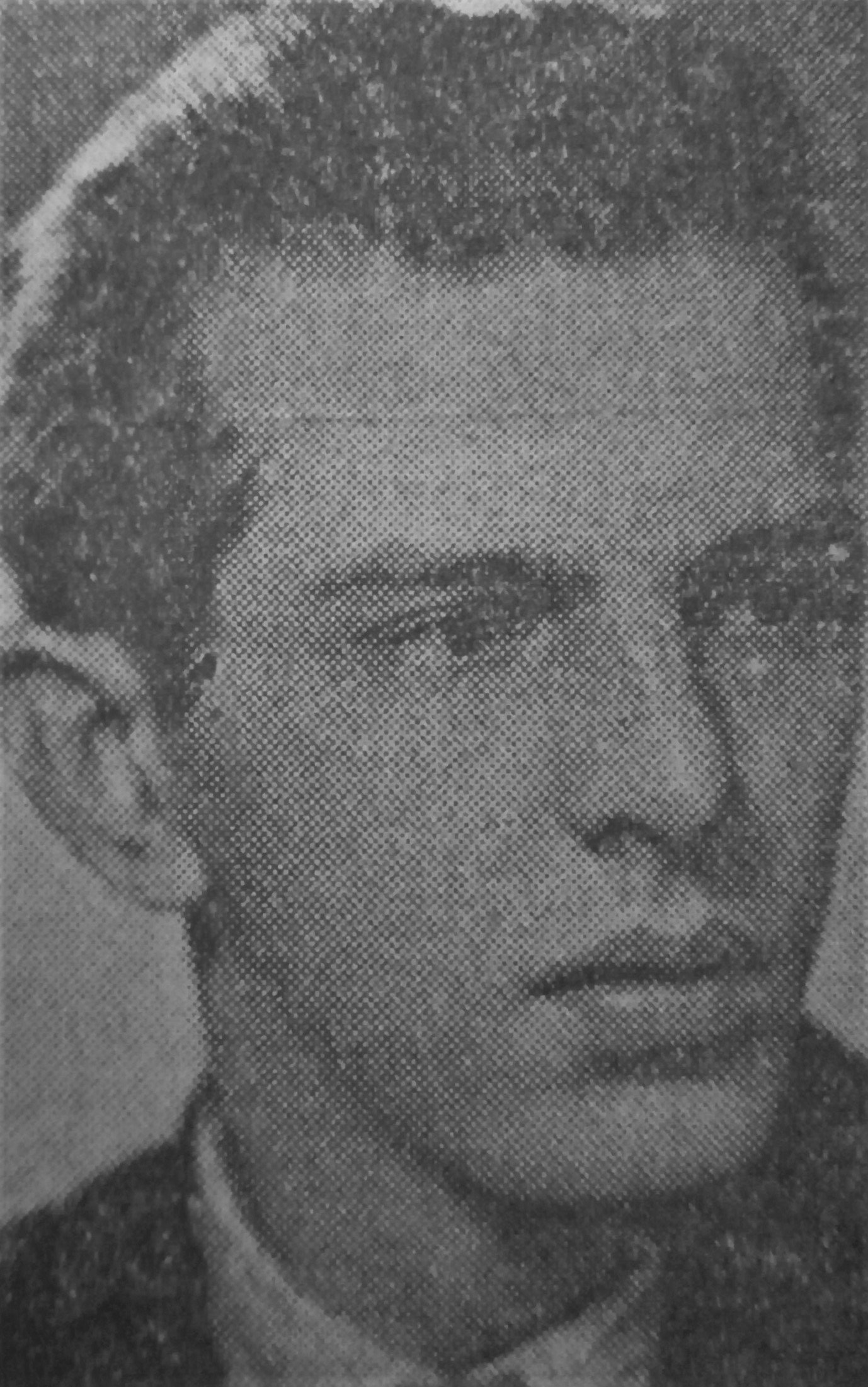
- Photograph from c. 1948
- Born: 6 June 1922; Lwów, Second Polish Republic
- Died: 4 October 1993 (aged 71); Kraków, Poland
- Known for: Novels, dramas, science fiction
- Notable work: Wielka, większa i największa Ci z Dziesiątego Tysiąca
- Awards: Order of Polonia Restituta; Warsaw Uprising Cross; Medal of the 40th Anniversary of People's Poland; Order of the Smile

Jerzy Broszkiewicz (6 June 1922 – 4 October 1993) was a Polish prose writer, playwright, essayist, and publicist. He is best known for his dramas and young-adult literature. The young-adult literature usually took the form of historical or science-fiction novels. The dramas were performed in Poland and abroad, and his works were translated into at least 20 languages, with total print runs exceeding a million copies.

He wrote plays for theatre, radio, and television, as well as screenplays, essays, and critical writings on music and culture. His most acclaimed works include Kształt miłości (1950–51), a novelized biography of Frédéric Chopin, and Wielka, większa i największa (1960), a widely-read youth novel that was adapted into a feature film and was included in Polish school curricula during the People's Republic period. He was active in editorial work for the cultural periodicals Nowa Kultura and Przegląd Kulturalny. He received multiple state awards and honors, including the Commander's Cross of the Order of Polonia Restituta.

== Life ==
He was born on 6 June 1922 in Lwów in the Second Polish Republic (now Lviv, Ukraine); his father, Adam, was an officer in the Polish Armed Forces. From 1934, he was a student at the Jan Długosz Gymnasium in Lviv. In 1940, after finishing the Gymnasium and music school, he entered the Lviv National Music Academy. During the German occupation of Lviv from 1941 to 1944, he participated in underground cultural activities such as literary evenings and concerts, and was a louse-feeder at the Lviv Institute for Typhus and Virus Research under Professor Rudolf Weigl.

In 1944, he married Ewa Łomnicka and moved to Kraków, where he lived in the famous Literary House at 22 Krupnicza Street. For some time, he studied at the Academy of Music, described by Stanisław Frycie and Tadeusz Kwiatkowski as a "promising pianist", but he discontinued his studies in 1945. From that year, he was a member of the Polish Writers' Union (from 1957 to 1958, he was vice-president of the main board; from 1973, he was a member of the Kraków branch board of the union, and in 1975, its vice-president). From 1945 to 1947, he collaborated with the editorial office of the weekly Odrodzenie (including a job as a proofreader and theater critic) and the journal Teatr. He also worked with the newspapers Nowiny and Dziennik Polski (from 1945 to 1946). From 1947 to 1949, he co-edited the magazine Ruch Muzyczny, and from 1948 to 1951, he was an editor for the monthly Muzyka.

In 1948, he moved to Warsaw. From 1950 to 1951, he hosted a weekly cultural program on the radio and later was a writer for radio plays. From 1950 to 1963, he published in Nowa Kultura and Przegląd Kulturalny (where he was a member of the editorial board from 1953). From 1953 to 1954, he edited the artistic-literary supplement in Sztandar Młodych called Przedpole. In 1953, he joined the Polish United Workers' Party, and in the same year, he became a member of the editorial board of Przegląd Kulturalny, where he was a co-editor until 1963. From 1955 to 1956, he was the artistic director of the Estrada Theatre. In 1959, he returned to Kraków taking a job as a literary manager of the Ludowy Theatre in Nowa Huta until 1971. In 1960, he wrote for Gazeta Krakówska. In 1975, he became a member of the Kraków Polish United Workers' Party Committee and a member of the presidium of the Kraków club Kuźnica.

=== Private life ===
Broszkiewicz lived in Kraków's Krowodrza district. He was married to psychiatrist Ewa Broszkiewicz (1920–2000), daughter of mathematician Antoni Łomnicki. They had a daughter, Irena Broszkiewicz (1954–2021), a mathematician associated with Piotr Ferster, director of the literary cabaret Piwnica pod Baranami. Irena was her father's inspiration for the character Ika in the novel Wielka, większa i największa (Great, Greater, and Greatest).

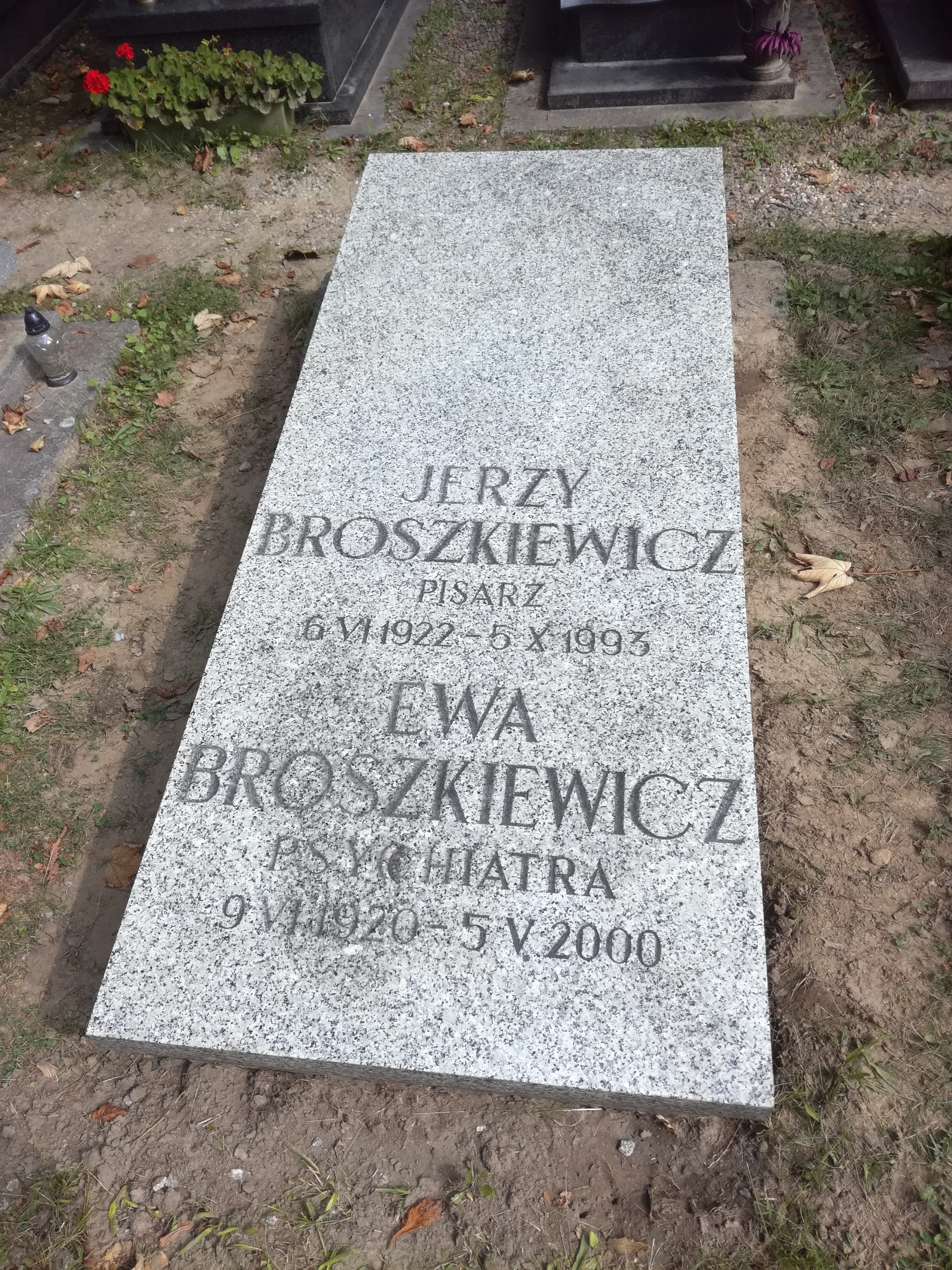
Grave of Jerzy Broszkiewicz in Kraków's Rakowicki Cemetery

Broszkiewicz suffered from schizophrenia. He died on 4 October 1993 in Kraków and is interred in the aleja zasłuźonych at the Rakowicki Cemetery (section LXIX, row B-2-2).

== Literary work ==
His literary work was diverse, and Frycie described Broszkiewicz as "an exceptionally talented and versatile writer". In 1945, he made his debut simultaneously as a music critic and as a writer with the short story Monika, published in the weekly Odrodzenie (No. 18). His book debut was the novel Oczekiwanie (Expectation) set in the ghetto, for which he received the Kraków Land Award.

Another significant work was the repeatedly reissued novel Kształt miłości (The Shape of Love) about Frédéric Chopin, for which he received the State Award of the 2nd degree in 1951. In 1971, the novel Długo i szczęśliwie (Happily Ever After) won the Association of Trade Unions Award. Kluska, Kefir i Tutejszy (Dumpling, Kefir, and the Local) was distinguished at the IV Premio Europeo in 1968.

He authored 14 novels for young readers, debuting with Opowieść olimpijska (Olympic Tale) in 1948, although most of his novels for younger audiences were written in the 1960s and 1970s. His earlier works in this genre were often biographical. Many of his later works belong to the science fiction genre, which Frycie considered the most significant part of his oeuvre. In particular, Wielka, większa i największa (The Great, Greater, and Greatest) from 1960 received high praise from critics and became a compulsory reading book for fifth grade. According to Frycie, in his works for young adults Broszkiewicz "exposed moral values such as resourcefulness, wisdom, nobility, and courage, and combined various narrative techniques, genres, and literary conventions".

Moreover, he wrote well-received dramas, being a multiple winner of drama competitions. He penned over 20 theatrical, television, and radio plays. He also wrote collections of essays, television and film scripts (e.g., Kopernik [Copernicus]), and publications on music. Some of his plays were produced abroad, including in France, Germany, Switzerland, Mexico, New Zealand, and the US. Broszkiewicz's works have been translated into at least 20 languages, and the total print run of his novels exceeded 1 million copies.

Broszkiewicz also helped in writing the debut novels of Sat-Okh: Ziemia słonych skał (Land of Salty Rocks, 1958) and Biały mustang (White Mustang, 1959). According to Dariusz Rosiak, Broszkiewicz was even their actual undisclosed author based on Sat-Okh's stories.

== Selected works ==
=== Young adult novels ===
- Opowieść olimpijska (The Olympic Tale) – 1948
- Opowieść o Chopinie (The Tale of Chopin) – 1950; adaptation of Kształt miłości (Shape of Love)
- Jacek Kula – 1952
- Powrót do jasnej polany (Return to the Sunny Meadow) – 1953
- Emil! Emil! – 1954
- Wielka, większa i największa (The Great, Greater, and Greatest) – Nasza Księgarnia, 1960; reading for fifth grade during the Polish People's Republic era; based on which a feature film was made
- Ci z Dziesiątego Tysiąca (Those from the Tenth Thousand) – Nasza Księgarnia, 1962; science fiction
- Oko Centaura (The Eye of the Centaur) – Nasza Księgarnia, 1964; science fiction; sequel to Those from the Tenth Thousand
- Długi deszczowy tydzień (A Long Rainy Week) – Nasza Księgarnia, 1966; sequel to Great, Greater, and Greatest; published in the Biblioteka Młodych (Young Readers' Library) collection
- Kluska, Kefir i Tutejszy (Dumpling, Kefir, and the Local) – Nasza Księgarnia, 1967
- Mój księżycowy pech (My Lunar Misfortune) – science fiction; Nasza Księgarnia, 1970, in the Klub Siedmiu Przygód (Seven Adventures Club) series and Nasza Księgarnia, 1976, in the Biblioteka Młodych collection
- Mister Di – Nasza Księgarnia, 1972
- Samotny podróżny (The Lonely Traveler) – 1973; provided the basis for the series Kopernik (Copernicus) with Andrzej Kopiczyński; 19 February 1973 marked the 500th anniversary of the astronomer's birth
- Bracia Koszmarek, magister i ja (The Koszmarek Brothers, the Master, and I) – 1980

=== Other novels ===
- Oczekiwanie (Expectation) – 1948
- Kształt miłości (The Shape of Love) – Part I, 1950, Part II, 1951; based on which the feature film Youth of Chopin was made
- Imiona władzy (Names of Power) – 1957
- Długo i szczęśliwie (Happily Ever After) – 1970
- Dziesięć rozdziałów (Ten Chapters) – 1971–1974
- Doktor Twardowski (Doctor Twardowski) – 1977–1979

=== Dramas ===
- Imiona władzy (Names of Power) – 1957
- Jonasz i błazen (Jonah and the Jester) – 1958
- Dwie przygody Lemuela Gulliwera (Two Adventures of Lemuel Gulliver)
- Dziejowa rola Pigwy (The Historical Role of Pigwa) – 1960
- Skandal w Hellbergu (Scandal in Hellberg) – 1961
- Głupiec i inni (The Fool and Others)
- Koniec księgi VI (The End of Book VI)

=== Non-fiction ===
- Pożegnanie z katechizmem [Farewell to the Catechism] (in Polish). Vol. III. Warsaw: Iskry. 1958.

== Orders and decorations ==
- Commander's Cross of the Order of Polonia Restituta (1975)
- Officer's Cross of the Order of Polonia Restituta
- Knight's Cross of the Order of Polonia Restituta (1954 or 11 July 1955)
- Warsaw Uprising Cross
- Medal of the 40th Anniversary of People's Poland (1984)
- Medal of the 10th Anniversary of People's Poland (19 January 1955)
- Order of the Smile

== Awards ==
- 1948 – Kraków Land Award – for the novel Oczekiwanie
- 1951 – State Award Badge, Second Class in the field of Literature and Art – for the novel Kształt miłości
- 1960 – Artistic Award of Nowa Huta – for promoting culture and overall dramaturgical activity
- 1961 – Minister of National Education Award in Kraków
- 1961 – Second Prize in the Kraków City Dramatic Competition – for the play Skandal w Hellbergu
- 1962 – Second Prize in the National Council Dramatic Competition in Bydgoszcz – for the play Niepokój przed podróżą (Unease Before the Journey)
- 1964 – First Prize in the Competition for Contemporary Television Drama – for the play Ta wieś, Mogiła (That Village, Grave)
- 1965 – Golden Screen Award for 1964 – for the play Ta wieś, Mogiła
- 1968 – Città di Caorle Award – for the young adult book Kluska, Kefir i Tutejszy
- 1971 – Association of Trade Unions Award – for the novel Długo i szczęśliwie
- 1974 – Prime Minister's Award – for work for children and youth
- 1979 – Prime Minister's First-Class Award for work for children and youth in the field of literature on the occasion of the 35th anniversary of the Polish People's Republic – for overall literary output
- 1982 – State First-Class Award for overall literary output
- 1984 – Kraków City Award
