= Louse-feeder =

Human fed to typhus-infected lice

Cages with typhus-carrying lice strapped onto a person's thigh. During World War II, feeding the lice with human subjects' blood was the only way to produce a viable typhus vaccine.

A louse-feeder (Polish: karmiciel wszy) was a job in interwar and Nazi-occupied Poland, at the Lviv Institute for Study of Typhus and Virology and the associated Institute in Kraków, Poland. Louse-feeders were human sources of blood for lice infected with typhus, which were then used to research possible vaccines against the disease.

Research into a typhus vaccine was started in 1920 by parasitologist Rudolf Weigl. Weigl and his wife Zofia Weigl were some of the earliest lice feeders. During the Nazi occupation of the city, louse-feeding became the primary means of support and protection for many of the city's Polish intellectuals, including the mathematicians Stefan Banach and Władysław Orlicz and the poet Zbigniew Herbert. While the profession carried a significant risk of infection, louse-feeders were given additional food rations, were protected from being shipped to slave labour camps and German concentration camps, and were permitted to move around the occupied city.

Typhus research involving human subjects, who were purposely infected with the disease, was also carried out in various Nazi concentration camps, in particular at Buchenwald and Sachsenhausen and to a lesser extent at Auschwitz.

== Background ==
Rudolf Weigl, the developer of first viable typhus vaccine in his laboratory in Lwów

French bacteriologist Charles Nicolle showed in 1909 that lice (Pediculus humanus corporis) were the primary means by which the typhus bacteria (Rickettsia prowazekii) were spread. In his experiments Nicolle infected a chimpanzee with typhus, retrieved the lice from it, and placed them on a healthy chimpanzee who developed the disease shortly thereafter. Further work established that it was lice excrement rather than bites which spread the disease. Nicolle received a Nobel Prize in Physiology and Medicine for his work on typhus in 1928.

During World War I, beginning in 1914, Rudolf Weigl, a Polish parasitologist of Austrian background was drafted into the Austrian army and given the task of studying typhus and its causes. Weigl worked at a military hospital in Przemyśl, where he supervised the newly established Laboratory for the Study of Spotted Typhus.

After Poland regained its independence, Weigl was hired in 1920 as a professor of biology at the Jan Kazimierz University in Lwów, at the Institute for Study of Typhus and Virology. While there, he developed a vaccine against typhus made from grown lice which were then crushed into a paste. Initially the lice were grown on the blood of guinea pigs but the effectiveness of the vaccine depended on the blood being as similar to human blood as possible. As a consequence, by 1933, Weigl began using human volunteers as feeders. While the volunteers fed healthy lice, there was still the danger of accidental exposure to some of the typhus-carrying lice in the institute. Additionally, once the lice were infected with typhus, they required additional feeding, which carried the risk of the human feeder becoming infected with the disease. Weigl protected the donors by vaccinating them beforehand, and although some of them (including Weigl himself) developed the disease, none died. However, the production of the vaccine was still a potentially dangerous activity, and it was still difficult to produce the vaccine on a large scale.

At the time Weigl's vaccine was the only one in existence which could be employed in practical applications outside of controlled settings. The first widespread use of his vaccine was carried out in China by Belgian missionaries between 1936 and 1943.

== Procedure ==
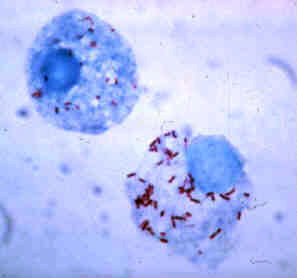
Rickettsia – typhus-causing bacteria

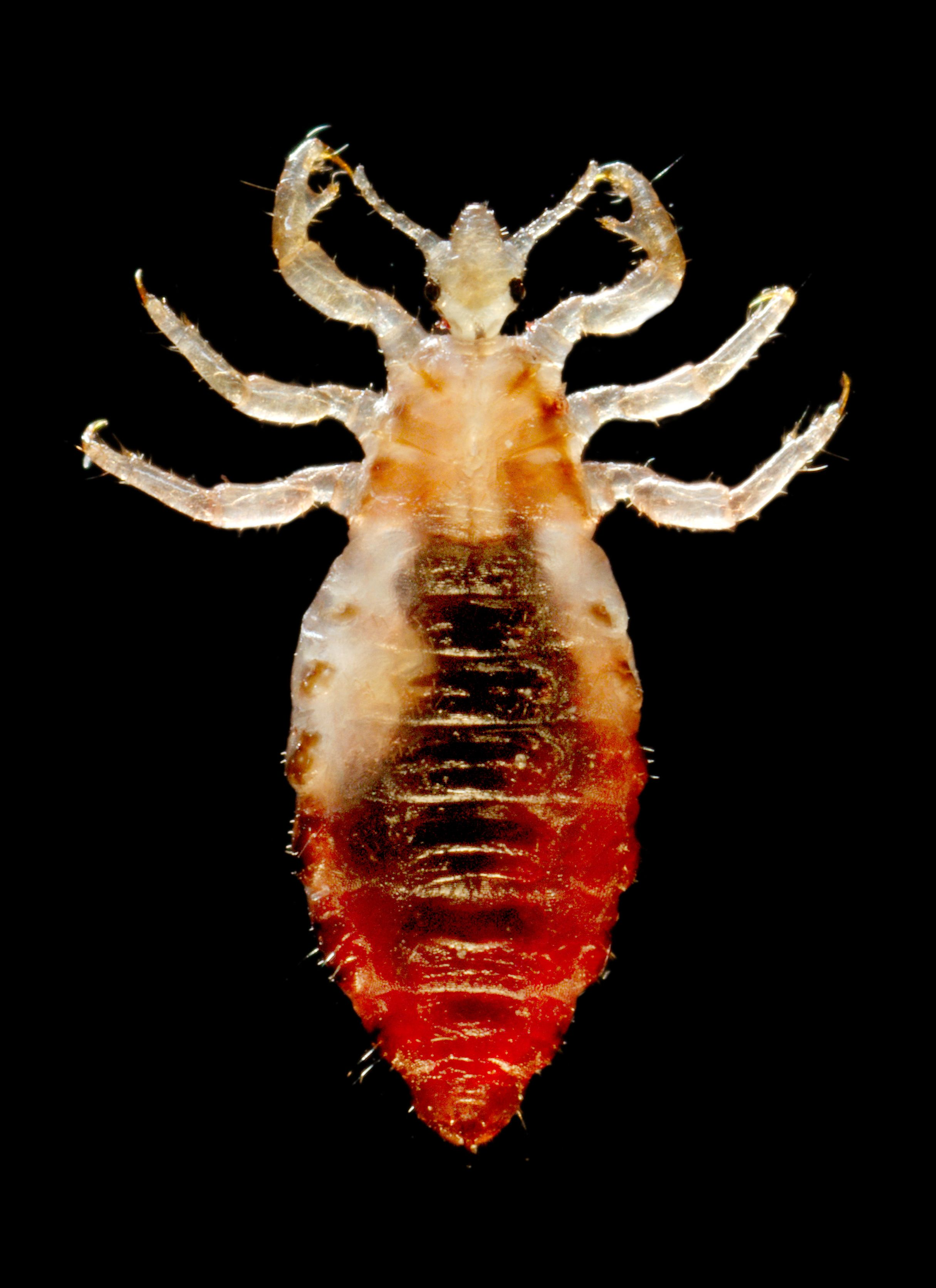
Typhus-spreading body louse

The development of the typhus vaccine involved several stages. First, the lice larvae had to be bred and then fed on human blood. Once they matured, they were removed from the feeders, held down in a clamp machine especially designed by Weigl, and anally injected with the strain of the typhus bacteria. At that point the infected louse had to be fed human blood for about five more days. This stage of the production process carried the greatest risk to the human feeder of contracting the disease. Weigl and his staff tried to prevent the danger by heavily vaccinating the feeders beforehand. Once the louse was sufficiently infected, it was removed from the human feeder, killed in a solution of phenol, and then dissected. The contents of the louse abdomen (its feces) was removed and then ground up into a paste. The paste was then made into the typhus vaccine.

The feeding was done through the use of specially-constructed small wooden boxes, 4 by 7 cm (1 1/2 by 2 3/4 in), developed by Weigl. The boxes were sealed with paraffin on the top which prevented the lice from escaping, and the underside consisted of a screen made of a fabric sieve, adapted by Weigl from sieves that were used by local peasants to separate wheat husks from the seeds. A typical box contained 400 to 800 lice larvae which would mature as the feeding took place. The sieve bottom allowed the lice to stick out their heads and feed on the human flesh. A standard feeding period took thirty to forty-five minutes, and was repeated with the same lice colony for twelve days. Usually, an individual feeder would accommodate from 7 to 11 boxes (of 400 to 800 lice each) on his or her leg, per feeding session. Typically men would place the boxes on their calves, to minimize the discomfort of the bites, while women feeders placed them on their thighs, so that the bite marks could be covered up by a skirt. A nurse had to watch over the feeding process as the lice would feed beyond the point of being gorged on the blood and could burst if left on the human flesh for too long.

Other dangers that employment at the institute involved, in addition to the contraction of typhus, concerned allergic reactions to the vaccine or asthma attacks because of the louse feces dust.

== World War II ==
=== First Soviet occupation ===
After the invasion of Poland by Nazi Germany and the Soviet Union in 1939, Lwów initially came under Soviet occupation. During this period Weigl's institute continued to function, although Poles, particularly those escaping from the German-controlled areas, were banned from being employed there. The Soviet authorities deported ethnic Poles from the seized territories, sending them to Kazakhstan, Siberia and other areas deep within the Soviet Union. Nevertheless, despite the official prohibition on employment, Weigl used his prestige and influence (during this time Nikita Khrushchev visited the institute) to secure the release of several Polish would-be deportees and in some cases managed to obtain permission for those who had already been exiled to return. These individuals were then given work in the institute as either nurses, interpreters (Weigl himself did not speak Russian) or as some of the first lice feeders; people who were given the job as a means of protecting them from persecution by the Soviet authorities.

The vaccine produced by the institute during this time was earmarked for the Red Army, aside from a small quantity used in the civilian sector.

=== Nazi occupation ===
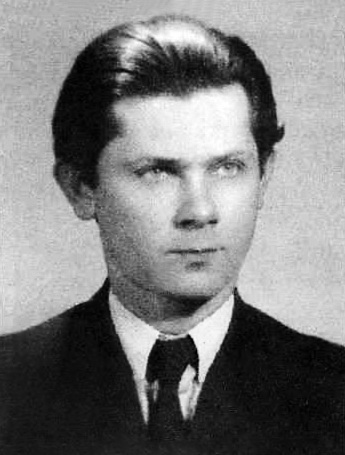
Poet Zbigniew Herbert, one of the feeders in German-occupied Lwów

In June 1941, after the Nazi attack on the Soviet Union, Lwów was taken over by the Germans. Weigl's institute, now renamed Institut für Fleckfieber und Virusforschung des OKH, was kept open because, much like the Soviets before them, the Germans were interested in the applications of the typhus vaccine among their front line soldiers. The institute was made directly subordinate to the German military, which, as it turned out, ended up giving its workers significant protection against the Gestapo. The Nazis converted a building of the former Queen Jadwiga Grammar School into Weigl's new laboratory and ordered that the production of the vaccine be stepped up, with the whole output being shipped to the German armed forces.

==== Role of institute under Nazi occupation ====
In light of the Sonderaktion Krakau, a German operation in which many distinguished professors from Jagiellonian University in Kraków were arrested and sent to German concentration camps, the danger that a similar fate would befall Lwów intellectuals was very real. As a result, in July 1941, Weigl began hiring prominent Polish intellectuals of the city for his institute, many of whom had lost work as a result of the closure of all Polish institutions of higher learning by the Nazis. In fact, soon after, the Nazis carried out a massacre of Lwów professors. Weigl managed to convince the occupation authorities to give him full discretion as to whom he hired for his experiments, even as he himself refused to sign the so-called Volksliste which would have identified him as an ethnic German (since he was of Austrian background) with access to privileges and opportunities unavailable to Poles. Similarly, he refused an offer to move to Berlin, direct a dedicated institute and become a Reichsdeutscher. The group of scholars hired by Weigl were often brought in by Wacław Szybalski, an oncologist, who was also put in charge of supervising the lice feeding.

Association with the institute offered a measure of protection. Weigl was able to continue his research, and even hire more people, some as research assistants, others as lice feeders, often among those threatened by Nazi authorities with deportation, or even resistance members. The feeders of lice who were employed at the institute were issued a special version of the Kennkarte, the "Ausweis", which noted both that they might be infected with typhus and that they worked for an institution of the German military, the "Oberkommando des Heeres" (Office of the Commander-in-Chief of the German Army). As a result, the workers of the institute, unlike other Poles in the city, could move freely about and, if stopped by the police or the Gestapo, were quickly released.

==== Lwów academics and intellectuals as feeders ====
In autumn of 1941, the mathematician Stefan Banach began working at the institute as a lice feeder, as did his son, Stefan Jr. Banach continued to work at the institute feeding lice until March 1944, and managed to survive the war as a result, unlike many other Polish mathematicians who were killed by the Nazis (although he died of lung cancer shortly after the war's conclusion). Banach's employment at the institute also gave protection to his wife, Łucja (it was she who purchased the notebook that eventually became the Scottish Book), who was in particular danger because of her Jewish background. The poet Zbigniew Herbert also spent the occupation as a lice feeder in Weigl's institute. According to Alfred Jahn, a geographer and future rector of the University of Wrocław, "Almost the entire University of Lwów worked at Weigl's". Two other future rectors of the University of Wrocław, Kazimierz Szarski and Stanisław Kulczyński, also survived the war as feeders of lice.

With numerous academics gathering in one place under the pretense of lice feeding and research, underground education and research often took place. The actual feeding time took only about an hour a day, which left the remainder of the day free for conspiratorial activity and scientific discourse.

==== Anti-Nazi resistance fighters as feeders ====
Additionally, Weigl began employing members of the Polish anti-Nazi resistance, the Home Army, in his institute, which provided them with sufficient cover to carry out their underground activities. Aleksander Szczęścikiewicz and Zygmunt Kleszczyński, two leaders of the underground scout movement, the Grey Ranks (Szare Szeregi), also worked at the institute. Due to his special position, Weigl was allowed to have a radio at the institute – otherwise ownership of a radio by Poles was punishable by death – which was used by him and members of the Polish resistance to gather up-to-date news of the war otherwise censored by German propaganda.

==== Attempts to save Jews via employment in the institute ====
When the Germans began the systematic murder of the Lwów Jews, Weigl tried to save as many as he could by hiring them as well. Among others, work at the institute saved the life of the bacteriologist Henryk Meisel. Weigl also tried to protect the bacteriologist Filip Eisenberg, from Jagiellonian University, by offering him a position. However, Eisenberg believed that he could survive the war by hiding in Kraków, turned down Weigl's offer, and in 1942 was caught by the Nazis and sent to the Belzec extermination camp where he was murdered. In the end, about 4000 people (feeders, technicians and nurses) passed through Weigl's institute, of whom about 500 are known by name.

==== Smuggling of the vaccine ====
While all of the vaccines produced by the institute during this time were supposed to go to the German army, some portion was smuggled out by the employees associated with the Polish resistance and shipped to partisan units of the Home Army, as well as underground movements in the Lwów and Warsaw ghettos, and even to sick individuals in the Auschwitz and Majdanek concentration camps. According to the famous Polish-Jewish pianist and diarist, Władysław Szpilman (the protagonist of the 2002 movie The Pianist), because of his vaccine, Weigl became "as famous as Hitler in the Warsaw ghetto", with "Weigl as a symbol of Goodness and Hitler as a symbol of Evil".

=== Soviet re-capture of the city ===
After the Red Army, along with the Home Army (Operation Tempest) recaptured Lwów in July 1944, Weigl's institute was disbanded and moved to central Poland, along with most other Polish inhabitants of Lwów. Weigl would continue his research in Kraków at Jagiellonian University.

== Lice feeding around the world ==
Human lice feeders were also used in America in the 1940s. The Wilmington Morning Star reported that the U.S. government's researchers paid around 60 lice feeders $60 a month (equivalent to $1,180 in 2025), rising to $120 (equivalent to $2,360 in 2025) due to the lack of people willing to participate. Humans were used because lice failed to thrive on animals, until it was discovered that some could live on an "Easter bunny" called Samson. Samson and his descendants were used to conduct hundreds of experiments.

== Notable feeders ==
- Jerzy Albrycht
- Stefan Banach (mathematician, founder of functional analysis)
- Feliks Barański (mathematician)
- Jerzy Broszkiewicz (author, essayist)
- Józef Chałasiński (sociologist)
- Leszek Elektorowicz (poet, essayist)
- Zbigniew Herbert (poet)
- Adam Hollanek (science fiction author)
- Artur Hutnikiewicz (historian of Polish literature)
- Alfred Jahn (geographer, polar explorer)
- Bronisław Knaster (mathematician)
- Seweryn Krzemieniewski (biologist)
- Jan Noskiewicz (zoologist)
- Lesław Ogielski (veterinarian, medical researcher)
- Władysław Orlicz (mathematician)
- Stanisław Skrowaczewski (classical conductor)
- Stefania Skwarczyńska (historian of literature)
- Kazimierz Smulikowski (geologist)
- Wacław Szybalski (oncologist)
- Mirosław Żuławski (writer, screenwriter) – who wrote about his work as a lice feeder in his screenplay Trzecia część nocy (The Third Part of the Night)

== Legacy ==
Weigl continued his research on typhus after the war. After his death, his studies were picked up by his friends, students, and his second wife, Anna-Herzig Weigl.

Rudolf Weigl was posthumously awarded the medal of Righteous among the Nations by the Yad Vashem in 2003. His contributions to saving lives during the Nazi German occupation of Poland have been compared to those of Oskar Schindler.
