= King John III Sobieski 2nd Secondary School (Kraków) =

Coordinates: 50°4′5.22″N 19°55′52.95″E

King John III Sobieski 2nd High School
- Kraków, Małopolska; Poland

Information
- Type: Liceum ogólnokształcące
- Motto: (la) Si Deus nobiscum, quis contra nos? (pl) Jeśli Bóg jest znami, któż jest przeciwko nam? (en) If God be with us, who is against us?
- Established: 1883
- Principal: dr Wioletta Nogaj
- Enrollment: Approx. 1000
- Colours: white and green
- Website: sobieski.krakow.pl

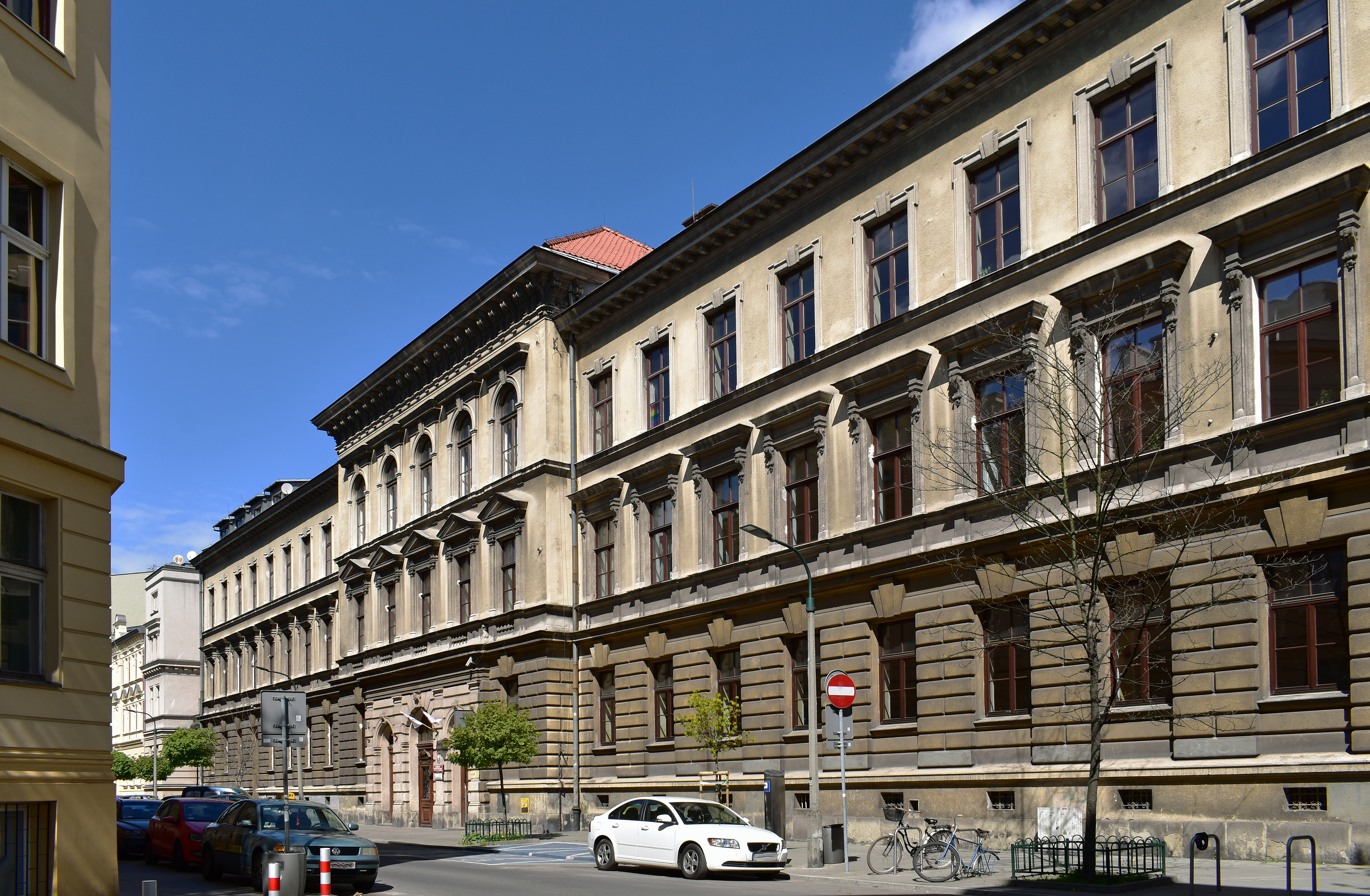
King John III Sobieski 2nd High School, 2019

King John III Sobieski 2nd High School is a high school in Kraków, Poland. It was founded in 1883.

== History ==
The school was founded as a tribute to King Jan III Sobieski and his victory at battle of Vienna. The new building, which is still the location of Jan III Sobieski High School was completed in 1887. The students took part in both World Wars, fighting for the independence of Poland.

During the Nazi occupation of Poland, the Germans made an office building of the school and destroyed the book collection. After the Wehrmacht left Kraków, the school was first in the city that started holding classes again.

Since 1969 the school has been an organizer of a theatrical contest Festiwal Małych Form Teatralnych (Small Theatrical Forms Festival), where many famous Polish actors started their careers.

A student of Sobieski High School, Przemysław Mazur, was awarded a gold medal at the International Mathematical Olympiad in 2006, 2007 and 2008.

Sobieski High School is a member of Towarzystwo Szkół Twórczych (en. Society of Creative Schools) – movement of Polish schools willing to share experiences in order to increase students' development. Since 2009 it's also a part of international network of schools teaching German language Schulen: Partner der Zukunft (en. Schools: Partners of Future).

In the 2020 presidential election, two graduates of the school ran as candidates: Andrzej Duda and Władysław Kosiniak-Kamysz, and the former won the election and was elected for a second term.

== Facilities ==
The library holds approximately 20000 books, among which 10% are dated before 1939. Core of the collection is built of popular scientific positions covering all sciences. Students can also check out books published in foreign languages including English, German, French and Russian.

Sobieski High School officially opened a new athletic center with sports hall, two-level gym and fitness room in September 2008. Costs of the investment were around 2.5 mln USD (7.2 mln PLN).

== Famous alumni ==
- Jan Stanisław Bystroń – sociologist and ethnographer
- Stefan Banach - mathematician
- Leon Chwistek – painter, philosopher
- Andrzej Duda – President of Poland
- Filip Eisenberg – bacteriologist
- Wlastimil Hofman – painter
- Tadeusz Hołuj – writer
- Marian Jedlicki – historian
- Zdzisław Krygowski – mathematician
- Józef Lustgarten – soccer player
- Franciszek Macharski – archbishop of Kraków
- Bronisław Malinowski – anthropologist
- Tadeusz Peiper – poet
- Edward Raczyński – president of Poland in exile
- Henryk Reyman – soccer player
- Maciej Stuhr – actor, comedian
- Jan Marcin Szancer – illustrator
- Tomasz Szczypiński – politician
- Jan Sztaudynger – poet, satirist
- Jerzy Turowicz – journalist
- Mariusz Ziółko – professor of electronics
- Jerzy Zubrzycki – sociologist

== Famous tutors ==
- Leon Chwistek (also an alumnus)
- Władysław Czapliński
- Agata Kornhauser-Duda
- Bolesław Faron (1958–1964)

== Cultural references ==
The semi-biographical movie Mała matura 1947 by Janusz Majewski released in 2010 tells a story of a young boy, Ludwik, who moved along with his family from Lviv to Kraków and attended Sobieski High School. The film won an honorary Special Award at the 35th Polish Film Festival.

== See also ==
- Nowodworek
