= Stefania Skwarczyńska =

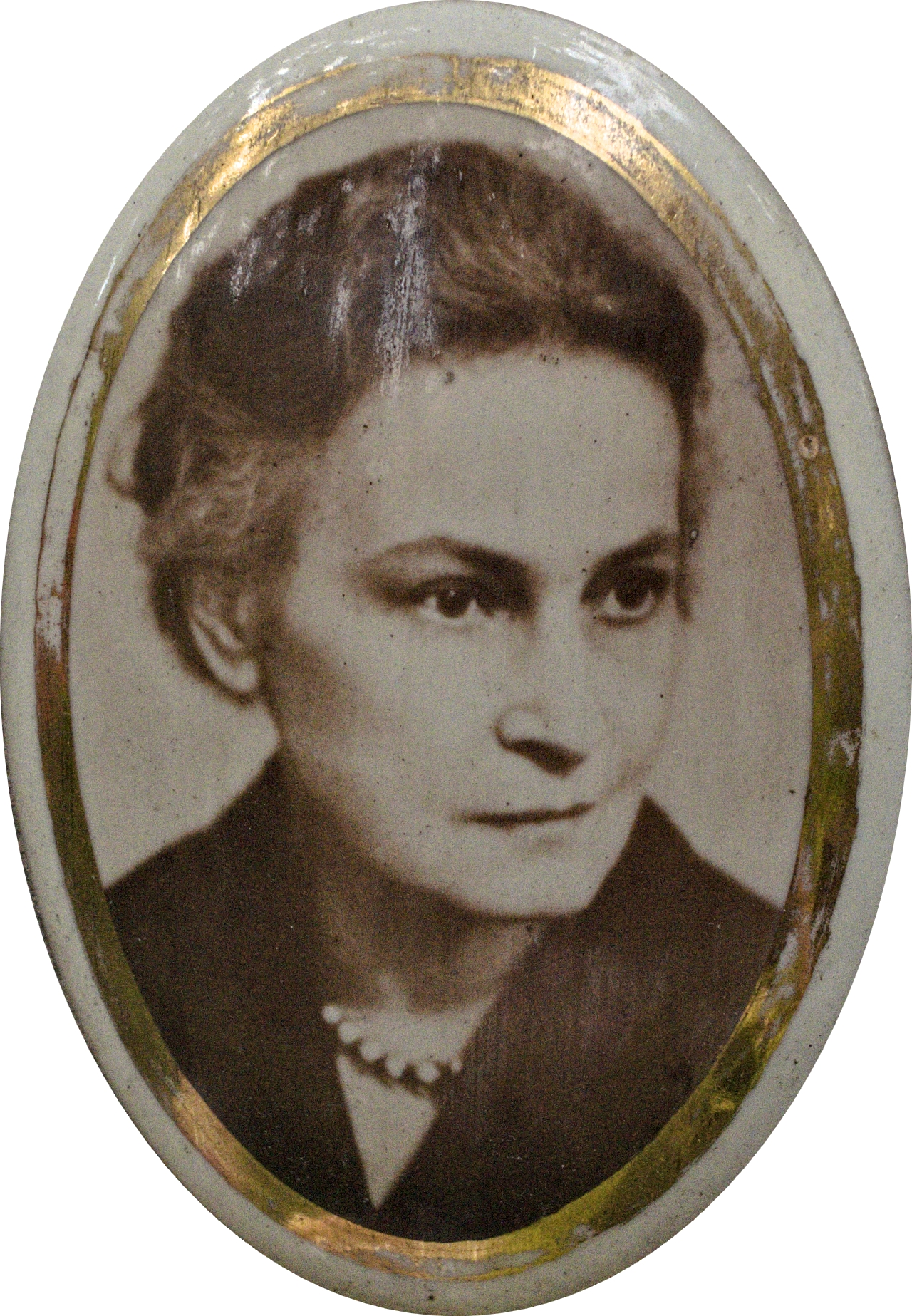

Stefania Skwarczyńska de domo Strzelbicka (17 November 1902 in Kamionka Strumiłowa – 28 April 1988 in Łódź) was a Polish theorist and historian of literature, theatrologist, full professor, doctor honoris causa of the University of Łódź, and World War II resistance fighter.

In 1937 she obtained her habilitation at the Jan Kazimierz University in Lviv for her work ‘The Aesthetics of Macaronism’. She was appointed associate professor of literary theory at the Faculty of Humanities of the Jan Kazimierz University in Lviv. In 1939, she became an associate professor at the Łódź branch of the Free Polish University. In the academic year 1938/1939, she was assigned to the Department of History and Theory of Literature, but her work there was interrupted by the outbreak of World War II.

In April 1940, as the wife of a Polish officer imprisoned in Starobelsk officer's camp, she, her children, and her mother-in-law were exiled to Kazakhstan, from where she was released back to Lwów by the efforts of scientists and continued her work at Lwów University. During the German occupation she was employed at the Lviv Institute for Typhus and Virus Research as a manager of the department of "lice feeders" (1941–1944). During this time she took part in the underground education in Poland during World War II. In 1945 she became a member of the Union of Armed Struggle, known under the noms de guerre: "Maria" and "Jarema" and took part in actions for liberating the Jews.

In 1945, she became a professor at the newly established University of Łódź, where she headed the Department of Literary Theory. She also lectured in Łódź at the State Higher Schools of Pedagogy, Theatre and the Film, and then in at the merged Leon Schiller State Higher School of Theatre and Film. In 1958, she became a full professor.

Skwarczyńska's extensive creative output spanned several disciplines. As a literary theorist, she first developed the pioneering concept of ‘applied literature’ (functional literature, distinguished from autonomous ‘fine literature’; 1932), postulating and developing research on various genres of functional texts. The extensive and innovative monograph 'Teoria listu' [The Theory of the Letter] (1937), based on these assumptions, became a revelation. She then formulated an innovative, revolutionarily bold, and still underappreciated concept of a literary work as ‘any meaningful verbal creation’ (1954), opening herself up to the recognition of all verbal activity as a manifestation of human existence. Then (1965), she provided a precise description of the literary genre (distinguishing ‘names, concepts and genological objects’) and a whole theory of genres. She presented her extensive knowledge of literary research methodology, derived from the analysis of source texts, in her now classic synthesis "Directions in Literary Research" (1984), which is rich in insightful micro-interpretations of individual theoretical concepts.

In 1988 a documentary about her was released, Stefania Skwarczyńska – szkic do portretu uczonej.

== Articles ==
- Skwarczyńska S., 1980, The Undetermined Problem Of Basic Genology, in: Language, Literature & Meaning, Vol. 2, ed. by J. Odmark, The Netherlands: John Benjamins Publishing Company, p. 201-232.

== Books ==
- Ewolucja obrazów u Słowackiego. Lwów 1925
- Szkice z zakresu teorii literatury. Lwów 1932
- Teoria listu. Lwów 1937 (pierwsze wznowienie: Białystok 2005)
- Z teorii literatury cztery rozprawy. Łódź 1947
- Systematyka głównych kierunków w badaniach literackich. Łódź 1948, vol. I
- Studia i szkice literackie. Warszawa 1953
- Wstęp do nauki o literaturze. Warszawa 1954-1965, vols. I-III
- Mickiewiczowskie „powinowactwa z wyboru”. Warszawa 1957
- Leona Schillera trzy inscenizacje „Nie-Boskiej komedii” Zygmunta Krasińskiego. Warszawa 1959
- Teoria badań literackich za granicą. Warszawa 1965, vols. I i II
- W kręgu wielkich romantyków polskich. Warszawa 1966
- Wokół teatru i literatury. Warszawa 1970
- Pomiędzy historią a teorią literatury. Warszawa 1975
- Kierunki w badaniach literackich. Warszawa 1984
- W orbicie literatury – teatru – kultury naukowej. Warszawa 1985

== Awards and decorations ==
- 1954: Gold Cross of Merit
- 1954: Medal of the 10th Anniversary of People's Poland
- 1959: Medal of Peace, World Peace Council
- 1965: Individual Award of 1st degree from the Ministry of Education of the Polish People's Republic
- 1966: Officer's Cross of the Order of Polonia Restituta
- 1969: Medal of the Commission of the National Education
- 1978: Prize of the Scientific Society of the John Paul II Catholic University of Lublin, "for the lifetime scientific achievements in the spirit of Christian humanism"
