= Alfred Jahn =

Polish geographer (1910–1940)

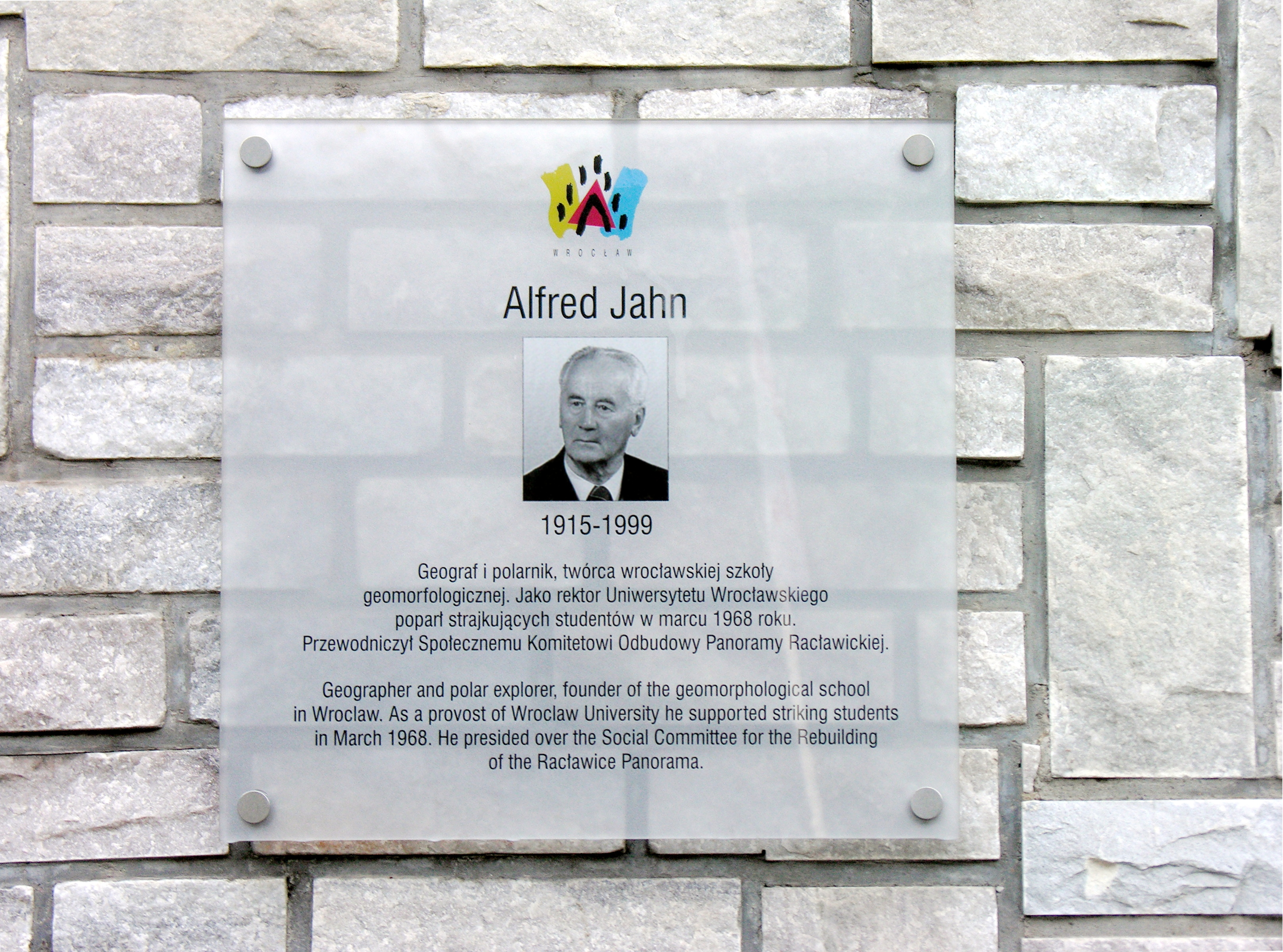
- Commemorative plaque for Alfred Jahn in Wrocław.
- Born: 22 April 1915; Kleparów, Austria-Hungary
- Died: 1 April 1999 (aged 83); Wrocław, Poland
- Citizenship: Poland
- Education: University of Lviv
- Awards: Albrecht-Penck-Medaille (1994)
- Scientific career
- Fields: Geomorphology; Quaternary geology
- Workplaces: Wrocław University

Alfred Jahn (22 April 1915, Kleparów, near Lwów (L'viv) – 1 April 1999, Wrocław) was a Polish geographer, geomorphologist, polar explorer and rector of Wrocław University.

== Biography ==
He was born on 22 April 1915 in Kleparów, near Lwów (L'viv). He obtained a Masters of Science degree at the Jan Kazimierz University in Lwów in 1937. In the same year he took part in the First Polish West Greenland Expedition, organized by Aleksander Kosiba, which provided him with enough material for his PhD dissertation. Completed in 1939, it had the title "Investigations on the structure and temperature of soils in West Greenland".

Jahn survived the Nazi occupation of Poland by working as a feeder of lice at Rudolf Weigl's typhus research institute in Lwów. After the war he first worked in Lublin, at the Maria Curie-Skłodowska University, and then in the reconstituted Wrocław University (which included a large number of the faculty from Jan Kazimierz University in Lwów who survived the war). In the 1950s he resumed his polar studies, participating in expeditions to Spitsbergen and the Polish Polar Station in Hornsund. He also conducted research in Siberia, Alaska and other parts of Scandinavia which made him one of the foremost polar geomorphologists in the world. He was made president (rector) of Wrocław University in 1962. In 1953 and 1980 Alfred Jahn published various works on the Polish part of the Sudetes Mountains emphasizing the role of climate in shaping the mountains.

In 1968, as a rector of Wrocław University, he made the decision to support the student strikes against Communist censorship. As a result, he lost his job. Likewise, during the martial law in Poland in 1982, he spoke out against the policies of the Jaruzelski government and was consequently removed by the authorities from his position as chair of the Committee on Polar Research of the Polish Academy of Sciences.

In 1972 he founded the Polar Club of the Geographical Society of Poland and served as its first president until 1982. Jahn retired in the 1990s but remained scholarly active until his death on 1 April 1999 in Wrocław.

Alfred Jahn was a member of the Polish Academy of Sciences, of Norwegian Academy of Science and Letters, and the German Akademie Leopoldina. He published his memoirs, "Z Kleparowa w świat szeroki" (From Kleparow into the big wide world), in 1991.
