= Zofia Weigl =

Polish biologist

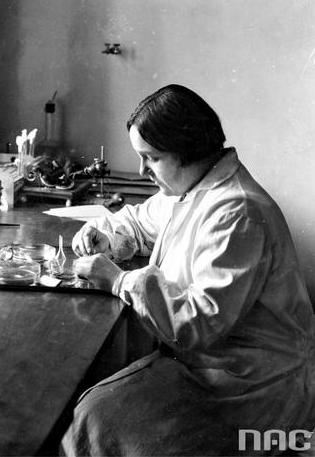
- Born: c. 1885
- Died: 1940 (aged 54–55)
- Education: University of Lviv
- Occupations: Biologist, vaccine researcher
- Spouse: Rudolf Weigl

Zofia Weigl (née Kulikowska; c. 1885–1940) was a Polish biologist who was a collaborator in research to find a vaccine for typhus.

== Life and work ==
Kulikowska was born into the family of lawyers, Wiktor and Marta Kulikowski. She had three sisters: Wanda, Helena and Stefania. Zofia passed her high school final exams at the girls' high school in Lwów (now Ukraine). She graduated from the University of Lwów. In mid-1912, the school board appointed her as teacher at the four-class folk school in Loshniiv. She went on to earn her doctorate in biology and became an associate professor and began scientific collaboration with Rudolf Weigl (inventor of the world's first effective vaccine against typhus) at the Lviv Institute for Typhus and Virus Research. They married in 1921 and she took his last name as her own.

Zofia Weigl became one of her husband's closest collaborators at the Institute.

During the Nazi occupation of Lwów, she became one of the first lice feeders who provided human blood for lice infected with typhus. The insects were then used to identify possible vaccines against the disease so the German Army could be protected. By becoming a louse-feeder, one assumed a significant risk of infection, but the people who chose to do this were given extra food rations, were protected from being shipped to slave labor camps and German concentration camps, and were even permitted to move around the occupied city during World War II.

Zofia and Rudolf Weigl had a son, Wiktor (one of his two daughters is psychologist Krystyna Weigl-Albert). The family lived in the Kulikowski family's tenement house at 4 Wagilewicza Street in Lwów. After Zofia's death in 1940, Rudolf's second wife, Anna Herzig, became his assistant.

== Selected awards ==
- Knight's Cross of the Order of Polonia Restituta (November 9, 1931) for merits in the scientific and social field.
