= Wielka, większa i największa =

Science fiction young adult novel by Jerzy Broszkiewicz

- Cover of the 1981 edition of the book
- Author: Jerzy Broszkiewicz
- Language: Polish
- Genre: science fiction
- Publisher: Nasza Księgarnia
- Publication date: 1960
- Publication place: Poland
- Media type: novel
- Followed by: Długi deszczowy tydzień

Wielka, większa i największa (Great, Greater, and Greatest) is a Polish science fiction young adult novel by Jerzy Broszkiewicz, published in 1960 by Nasza Księgarnia.

The novel is divided into three parts. The protagonists experience three titular adventures – rescuing a kidnapped child, saving survivors from a plane crash, and finally, meeting aliens and diplomatically defending humanity from them. In all their adventures, their guide is a talking car, an Opel Kapitän.

The novel was acclaimed by critics, who praised the combination of science fiction with promotion of ethical and moral values. Literary scholars have recognized it as a significant work in the development of Polish modern young-adult literature. In 1963 it was adapted as a film. From 1970 onward, the novel was 5th-grade compulsory reading.

== Plot ==
The protagonists, a pair of exceptionally intelligent teenagers, Ika (a diminutive of Irka, named after the author's daughter) and Groszek (the author's alter ego, derived from his nickname Broszek), embark on three adventures where they demonstrate ingenuity, bravery, and compassion. In all their adventures, they are guided by a talking Opel Kapitän car.

In the first adventure, Ika and Groszek hear a radio announcement about the disappearance of a young boy, Jacek Kilar. They are unexpectedly asked to help find him by machines that have previously served humans passively. Their main helper is an old car deteriorating in the yard. Opel Kapitän is an extraordinary car: it drives itself, talks, and assists the children. The boy has been kidnapped by dangerous criminals. The young detectives, with the help of their mechanical friends, rescue the boy and lead to the capture of the kidnappers.

In the second adventure, it soon becomes apparent that the pair's assistance is needed once again. Kapitän takes them to the airport, where they board a plane heading towards Africa. Old Yakovlev, like Opel, can communicate with the children, and they must find the missing crew of a Douglas 125 aircraft that crashed over the Sahara. The missing crew is at risk of death if help does not arrive soon. Fortunately, Ika and Groszek, with the help of intelligent machines, locate the survivors.

During the third adventure, the young friends are appointed representatives of the entire planet Earth. Taken by an intergalactic ship to the planet Della in the Vega system, they must prove to its inhabitants that not all Earthlings have militaristic tendencies, that humans are not a warlike society threatening the cosmic community, and that observed nuclear explosions do not disqualify Earth's civilization from being capable of contact with other civilizations.

== History ==
The book's author, Jerzy Broszkiewicz, began writing in 1948; his works over time turned from biographies to science fiction, and were increasingly aimed at younger audience. Wielka, większa i największa was his first science fiction work, and arguably his most impactful work ever. According to Teresa Brzeska-Smerek, the novel initiated a new trend in Broszkiewicz's work ("science fiction-adventure with strongly emphasized ethical-moral values").

The novel was published in 1960 in the Nasza Księgarnia series Klub Siedmiu Przygód (The Club of Seven Adventures) with illustrations by Gabriel Rechowicz. The book had numerous reprints (about fifteen by 1988 and several times since, including in years 1990, 1994, 1997, 2004, 2006 and 2011).

=== Translations ===
The book was translated into, among other languages: (Note: Several instances of claimed translation, listed as such only by Frycie (1983), have yet to be confirmed with a specific bibliographic query. It is possible Frycie, while referring to the translations of this work, meant not only the translations of the book, but also foreign-language releases of the film based on it (for example, the film was released in German under Das zauberhafte Auto title).)

- Bulgarian
- Czech as Velké, větší, největší (1963 and 1964)
- Estonian as Suur, suuram, köige suuram (1966)
- German
- Russian as Одно другого интересней - Odno drugogo interesnej (lit. One is more interesting than the other; 1964, 1987, 2019)
- Romanian
- Serbo-Croatian as Velika, veća i najveća (1964 and 1977)
- Slovak as Vel’kä vaćśia a najvaćśia (1962 and 1974)
- Ukrainian as Велика, більша й найбільша -Velyka, bil'sa j najbil’sa (1966)
- Hungarian

=== Sequel ===
The characters from this book also appear in another Broszkiewicz novel, Długi deszczowy tydzień (A Long Rainy Week).

== Adaptations ==
It also received theatrical adaptations (under the title Planeta Nadziei [Planet of Hope] in 1962 and under the original title in 1966), radio adaptations (under the title Pierwsza wielka przygoda [The First Great Adventure] in 1966 and 1975), a television adaptation (in 1963), and a film adaptation (also in 1963).

== Awards and recognition ==
In addition to the numerous reprints, adaptations, and translations, the novel was also a compulsory reading for 5th grade in the Polish People's Republic (from 1970). In 1979, it was included on the Special Hans Christian Andersen Honor List 1979, a list created by the International Board on Books for Young People. Even in the mid-2010s, it remained a recommended reading in Polish schools (for 6th grade).

== Reception and analysis ==
=== Reviews ===
In 1960, Krystyna Kuliczkowska's reviewed this novel in Nowe Książki. Her review was highly positive, praising the poetic mood of the novel, though she criticized the excessive "humanization" (anthropomorphization) of the car, Captain, as a minor flaw. She especially praised the third part of the book, the "greatest adventure", calling it "one of the most charming science fiction tales we've read recently". In the same year, a critic using the pseudonym "bem" reviewed the novel for Świat. According to the reviewer, due to its science fiction elements (such as replacing talking animals with talking machines), it could capture children's interest more effectively than traditional fairy tales. He praised the novel as "charming" and "light", as well as the illustrations, which he described as "lovely" and (again) "light". He also praised the book's poetics, aimed at children, and its educational value. That same year, Halina Bazarewska reviewed the novel for Nowa Kultura. She also gave the book a positive review, observing that it has "enormous educational value".

In 1962, Jan Zygmunt Jakubowski found the structure of the novel intriguing and praised it as "an example of good literary craftsmanship". He particularly valued the book's "intellectual and moral ambitions" and its successful engagement with "moral and ideological" issues relevant to contemporary society. Jakubowski concluded that while the pedagogical and artistic dimensions of the novel could be further debated, it was "undoubtedly a very interesting and ambitious attempt at a modern book for young readers... combining elements of realism, science fiction, and philosophical-moral issues". In 1965, Wanda Krzemińska described the novel as an original, amusing, and educational blend of realism and science fiction. In 1969, Kuliczkowska revisited the book, describing it as a poetic and engaging mix of realism and science fiction that addressed moral and philosophical problems. In 1979, Stanisław Frycie positively reviewed the "greatest adventure", writing that the author "presented [it] poetically and thought-provokingly". In 1983, Józef Zbigniew Białek noted that the book was praised for its intellectual and moral ambitions, and as a convincing introduction of children to contemporary issues.

=== Main themes ===
==== Promotion of positive values ====
Numerous reviewers and critics commented on educational value of the novel, with regards to its promotion of positive values. Andrzej Niewiadowski, for example, classified the book as part of educational science fiction. According to Bazarewska, the book promotes values of goodness and courage and criticizes conflict. Jakubowski identified the book's central theme as the "individual responsibility of humans for the fate of others and the world". Słupska identified book themes such as youth's responsibility for the fate of the world, and the importance of ethical values such as kindness, nobility, and courage. Stefania Wortman also highlighted the novel's educational value, emphasizing the moral virtues (courage, loyalty, sacrifice, nobility, bravery) represented by the child protagonists. In 1979 Frycie noted that the novel deals with "the concerns of our times and an exaltation of moral values: wisdom, kindness, and courage". In 1983, he revisited the book, describing it as "didactic and philosophical... formally innovative and containing various narrative techniques, diverse genres, and literary conventions". In 1991, Barbara Dyduch wrote about the book for Polonistyka. She identified the core values of the book as "kindness, selflessness, and courage", with the main theme being "doing good selflessly and anonymously". She saw the book as representing more valuable material ("charming, gentle, cheerful") compared to the "aggression" of newer works. Grzegorz Leszczyński, writing in 2002, identifies the central themes of the book as: moral and existential anxiety of contemporary times, human solidarity, and moral responsibility (including the protection of the world from destruction).

==== Optimistic visions of the youth ====
Kuliczkowska identified the main theme of the book as the "nobility of a child, which allows one to believe in the happy future of the world". Niewiadowski saw the book as a critique of the adult world, where children behaved better than adults, who responded aggressively to the unknown out of fear.

Maciej Wróblewski, writing in 2012, pointed out that while in many of Broszkiewicz's works adults are positive role models for children, this novel reverses that pattern. Here, the adult world "is tainted by evil (injustice, violence, lies)", and the burden of saving humanity falls on the shoulders of innocent youth.

==== Optimistic visions of the future ====
The novel is also optimistic about the future development of technological society; Halina Bazarewska noted that addresses important issues such as the "success of technical sciences and the associated humanistic vision of future civilized societies". She also viewed the society of the Vegans as illustrating "the boldest dreams of an earthly paradise", where work was reduced solely to intellectual operations, as automation and robotics had eliminated the need for physical labor.

The optimistic visions of the future are nonetheless moderated by warnings dangers of the wrong use of technology and irresponsible policy makers. J. Słupska writing for Polonistyka in 1963 noted the novel message about benefits of peaceful nuclear energy, contrasted with the dangers of using atomic weapons. Niewiadomski and Antoni Smuszkiewicz, writing in 1990, interpreted the book as a warning to adults about "the harmful direction of ethical and ideological evolution". Writing after the end of the Cold War, Halina Skrobiszewska noted that the book contains a subtle critique of totalitarian regimes. In 2024, Piotr Konieczny of The Encyclopedia of Science Fiction similarly noted that the novel can also be read as a critique of the Cold War and nuclear weapons.

==== Science fiction themes ====
Several scholars discussed the book in the context of its motif of animated, sentient machines. Bazarewska noted that Broszkiewicz's animated machines successfully filled the role of traditional fairy tale props (like magical fairies or flying carpets). Likewise, Stefania Wortman referred to the novel as a combination of an "urban fairy tale" and science fiction, where the role of "extraordinary helpers" from fairy tales was taken over by animated technical devices.

Coming from the field of science fiction studies, Niewiadomski and Smuszkiewicz also highlighted the frequent science fiction themes of "the genius invention" and contact with extraterrestrials, which forms a major part of the last adventure. According to Frycie, Broszkiewicz innovatively simplified some science fiction elements, making the genre accessible to younger readers. This novel, he said, initiated Polish science fiction works "with a poetic tinge".

In 2025 Gary Westfahl observed that the broad plot of the third part of the novel bears a striking resemblance to Robert A. Heinlein's 1958 novel Have Space Suit – Will Travel, observing that both stories are "about aliens based in the Vega star system who are convinced by two young humans to give the human race another chance to demonstrate its emerging maturity".

=== Milestone in Polish youth fiction ===
Many critics and reviewers noted that the book was an important and innovative development in the history of Polish youth fiction. Already in 1960, Kuliczkowska stressed the "original, modern take" on the subject and the large number of "original and creatively assembled ideas"; "bem" noted that it was a work long missing in Polish literature – a modern fairy tale adapted to contemporary times; and Bazarewska called it an "exceptionally original achievement in children's literature".

In 1962, Jakubowski described the novel as one of the most interesting titles published in recent years by Nasza Księgarnia and expressed hope that the book represented the future of creative development of young adult literature. Kuliczkowska revisited the work in 1967, noting that it surprised critics with its quality and vision as "a piece firmly rooted in the realities of the contemporary world, multi-layered, with underlying themes"; she compared it to Porwanie w Tiutiurlistanie (The Abduction in Tiutiurlistan) by Wojciech Żukrowski from 1946. Next year, she acknowledged the novel's significance due to its innovative (for Polish literature) combination of realism (the contemporary world) with science fiction. In 1983 Frycie identified the novel as the first noteworthy Polish science fiction work aimed at children. Similarly to Kuliczkowska's 1967 review, he noted that "the work generated significant interest among both critics and readers", and was received favorably by the former and enthusiastically by the latter In 1990 Niewiadowski and Smuszkiewicz noted that the novel was a "significant event in the post-war history of Polish science fiction".

According to Dyduch, writing in 1991, "situated on multiple levels – realistic, fantastic, and futuristic – the parabolic novel by Broszkiewicz allows for unconventional analysis, serving the understanding of the modern novel, whose plot adheres to non-chronological orders". Analyzing the novel's narrative, she emphasized the importance of the travel motif, which stimulates children's imagination, focusing on positive, optimistic thinking about the future.

In 1999, Antoni Smuszkiewicz noted that the uniqueness of the book at the time of its publication was linked to its fantastic elements and their blending with real-world elements, which was rare in Polish contemporary children's and youth literature in the mid-20th century. However, he also observed that the book innovativeness and uniqueness in the Polish youth literature had a downside, as it led some teachers and students to consider the book "difficult", which he attributed to a lack of understanding of the concept of fiction writing among the young readers due to the dominance of realistic and documentary works in the Polish reading canon, as well as the simultaneous lack of experience in interpreting science fiction literature among both youth and educators. Leszczyński in 2002 also noted that the novel became "a significant event in the development of Polish science fiction for young readers".

=== Use in education ===
The book has been a compulsory or recommended reading in Polish schools for many years; and as early as 1963 Słupska presented a plan for using the book in school lessons. Some scholars commented on the novel's reception among schoolchildren. In 1982, Tadeusz Patrzałek observed that the novel was more popular among girls than boys in a study of reading preferences among 11-year-olds. In 1991 Dyduch noted that fifth-grade students preferred the adventurous "greater adventure", while eighth-grade students favored the "greatest adventure", intended for older readers ("due to its philosophical sense and stimulation for reflection"). However, she also observed that at that time the book was no longer a popular read among youth.

=== Genres ===
Skrobiszewska classified the novel as the first [Polish] allegorical fairy tale (a subgenre of literary fairy tales). She viewed its emergence and popularity as a reaction to contemporary and not very successful "attempts to harness fantasy in the service of a specific ideological doctrine" and due to its discussion of contemporary problems, of interest both to children and adults. Likewise, writes that the novel "was an anomaly after years of stagnation in literature for young readers" and "initiated a whole series of science fiction and experimental works" in the following years. In 2008, Maria Ostasz observed that the work was "innovative in terms of the artistic conventions used and the boldness of its axiological message", noting that the author "completely departed from the realistic convention" and "effectively combined the poetics of fairy tales with science fiction, giving the adventure-thriller novel a completely new character – a parable about humanity as responsible for the fate of the world".

Others discussed the structure of the work, composed of three distinct parts. Jakubowski noted that the three parts of the book each relate to different genres. He compared the first part to a suspense novel, the second to an adventure-travel story, and the third to a utopian science fiction tale. Białek likewise noted that critics recognized the novel's blending of various genres. According to Grzegorz Leszczyński, the novel combines various literary conventions – the genres of fairy tales, science fiction, and adventure fiction. He views the three parts of the book (three adventures) as forming a connected reflective circle – the characters first help an individual, then a group, and finally, all of humanity; similarly, the scale of the depicted world increases (city, planet, cosmos), as do the props used by the characters (car, airplane, spaceship). Leszczyński considers the talking car to be anthropomorphized, as is common in traditional folk tales. He identifies the central themes of the book as: moral and existential anxiety of contemporary times, human solidarity, and moral responsibility (including the protection of the world from destruction).
