= Ci z Dziesiątego Tysiąca =

Young adult science fiction novel by Jerzy Broszkiewicz

- Author: Jerzy Broszkiewicz
- Language: Polish
- Genre: science fiction
- Publisher: Nasza Księgarnia
- Publication date: 1962
- Publication place: Poland
- Media type: novel
- Followed by: Oko Centaura

Ci z Dziesiątego Tysiąca (Note: The title is also written as Ci z dziesiątego tysiąca – with dziesiątego tysiąca used not as a proper noun, but as a concept or geographical term, or as a colloquial expression.) (Those from the Tenth Thousand) is a young adult science fiction novel by Jerzy Broszkiewicz, published in 1962 by Nasza Księgarnia.

The characters also appear in the sequel to the novel, Oko Centaura (Eye of the Centaur) from 1964.

The novel presents an optimistic vision of the future, in which the young protagonists embark on numerous adventures in space, including rescuing older astronauts (including their parents) during malfunctions of their spaceships.

== Plot ==
The novel is set in a future world where humanity has colonized the Solar System, utilizing friendly, intelligent robots.

=== Ci z Dziesiątego Tysiąca ===
The protagonists are three teenagers living in the year 862 of the early space era: Ion Soggo and twins Alka and Alek Roj. They meet during a vacation at the research station "First Scout", an artificial asteroid (a "mechanoplanet") where their parents work. The Rojs are Earthlings (Poles from Toruń), while Ion is a Saturnian. They are looked after by an android named Robik. The station, located about ten thousand million kilometers from the Sun (hence the novel's title), is meant to test the possibility of sending a large spaceship beyond the Solar System. With a standard research mission underway, two spacecraft depart from the station, carrying all the scientists working on the Scout. The teenagers are left alone under the care of machines. Unexpectedly, one of the spacecraft suffers damage due to a collision with a meteor river. The second ship rushes to its aid but is also caught in the meteor stream. The only help can come from the three teenagers.

=== Oko Centaura ===
The plot centers around contact with aliens; characters from the previous volume reappear in the book. The protagonists embark on a journey to the star Proxima Centauri in the constellation of Centaurus, where they encounter an alien ship.

== Editions and translations ==
=== Ci z Dziesiątego Tysiąca ===
The novel was first published in 1962 by the Nasza Księgarnia publishing house and had seven editions by 1989. It was also reissued later (2021, Estymator Publishing, ISBN 978-83-66719-21-7). It has been translated into several foreign languages:

- Bulgarian (Trimata ot desatata chiljada, 1974)
- Czech (Trosečníci v řece meteorů, 1977)
- German (Die rot-weisse Sonne, 1973)
- Russian (Трое с Десятой тысячи, 1969)
- Slovak (Vesmírne dobrodružstvá, 1978 – combined edition with Mój księżycowy pech [My Lunar Misfortune])
- Ukrainian (Ці з Десятої тисячі, 1965, 1974)

=== Oko Centaura ===
The novel was published in 1964 by the Nasza Księgarnia publishing house. It was translated into German in 1968 (Das Auge des Centaurus).

The novel was illustrated by Jan Młodożeniec.

== Analysis ==
In 1964, Barbara Tylicka described both books for Kultura as a "two-volume novel" written "with a wink," "full of surprising ideas and wit," and at the same time "provoking thought." She praised the character of the robot (Robik) as a sympathetic and the most human character among the book's heroes, noting not only his behavior (carefulness, sense of humor) but also his evolution (increasingly human-like behavior, which Robik himself considers a "design flaw"), as well as his human-like appearance (wrinkles and freckles on his face). According to Tylicka, Robik is "an expression of human feeling of being lost in the universe, the imperfection of human nature, and at the same time a strong desire to preserve this modest existence for as long as possible." She simultaneously regarded Robik as both a friend of man and his improvement – the robot’s body being more efficient and stronger than a human’s. She compared Robik to Plastuś, suggesting that the character would be a popular toy for children if it had a physical form. Writing about the second volume, she considered it a work "with grace and a sense of humor," reflecting "the anxiety of the contemporary human" while also showing "pride in the achievements of human reason." Tylicka also criticized the human characters in the novel, who, compared to Robik, "appear pale" and due to their perfection and professionalism, resemble robots more than humans.

In 1979, Stanisław Frycie characterized the book as written in the traditional adventure-science fiction convention. Frycie noted that the depicted world, full of science fiction gadgets, fascinates the imagination, but he valued more the exploration of philosophical and moral themes. He assessed the world presented in the novel as optimistic – free of conflicts, showing heroes cooperating in solidarity. He also noted that the character of the robot Robik is presented very positively and "embodies the traits that should characterize people of the future: courage, wisdom, dedication to others, and a sense of humor." In 2007, Frycie revisited this position, considering it a more traditional science fiction for "older children" addressing philosophical and moral themes, and also positively assessing it as one of the more successful visions of the space era in post-war children’s science fiction. He identified the main theme of the series as the question "whether the development of technical civilization will bring happiness to humanity," and also noted that the series (especially the first volume) enjoyed significant popularity among readers.

According to Andrzej Niewiadowski and Antoni Smuszkiewicz, the novel contains a heroic vision of space conquest and addresses the common science fiction theme of contact with aliens. Niewiadowski noted in 1992 that both novels contain a frequent critique of the adult world found in Broszkiewicz’s works, where children must save it. In Ci z Dziesiątego Tysiąca, he highlights the theme of children rescuing their parents, while Oko Centaura he described as "a story of contact with another civilization established through the extraordinary inventiveness, resourcefulness, and sincerity of children’s emotions."

Maciej Wróblewski, writing in 2012, noted that Broszkiewicz avoids overt didacticism or idealization of relationships between adults and children in the novel. Instead, the relationship between generations in this novel is more partnership-oriented, partly forced by the dangers of space, which do not reward infantile rebellion of the young. The novels also praise taking reasonable challenges and critique conflict – in one scene in Oko Centaura, the heroine finds it unlikely that "people could have killed each other once, though historians claim so."
