= Eisenbergiella massiliensis =

Scientific classification
- Domain: Bacteria
- Kingdom: Bacillati
- Phylum: Bacillota
- Class: Clostridia
- Order: Eubacteriales
- Family: Lachnospiraceae
- Genus: Eisenbergiella
- Species: E. massiliensis

Binomial name
- Eisenbergiella massiliensis Togo et al. 2016

Type strain
- CSUR P2120, DSM 101499, AT11, AT9

Species of bacterium

Eisenbergiella massiliensis is a bacterium from the genus of Eisenbergiella which has been isolated from human faeces.
