= Filip Eisenberg =

Polish-Jewish doctor and bacteriologist

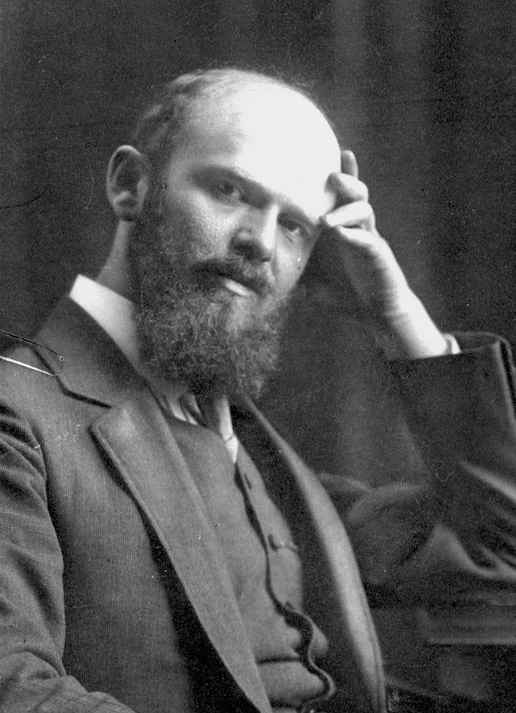
Filip Eisenberg

Filip Pinkus Eisenberg (July 19, 1876 – August 18, 1942) was a Polish-Jewish doctor and bacteriologist.

== Biography ==
Eisenberg was born on July 19, 1876, in Kraków, the son of merchant Adolf Abraham Eisenberg and Ester (née Spiro).

After finishing Sobieski Gymnasium in Kraków he studied medicine at the Jagiellonian University, where he obtained his PhD in medical studies in 1899. He then conducted postgraduate work in Vienna with Richard Paltauf and between 1901 and 1902 served as a research assistant to Odo Bujwid. Subsequently he worked in Paris, at the Pasteur Institute and then in Wrocław (Breslau) under the direction of Richard Pfeiffer.

Between 1919 and 1920 he was the head of a military hospital in Warsaw and an army surgeon. In 1933 he became the director of the National Bacteriology Station in Kraków, a position he held until 1939. Until 1941 he was the head of the Institute of Medical Microbiology in Lwów (Lviv).

During the Nazi occupation of Poland, Eisenberg was in constant danger because of his Jewish background. The Polish bacteriologist Rudolf Weigl sought to protect Eisenberg by offering him a position as a feeder of lice at his institute in Lwów. Eisenberg however believed that he could survive the occupation by hiding in Kraków. However, in 1941 he was caught and forced to live in the Kraków Ghetto. From there, in 1942 he was sent to the Belzec extermination camp where he was murdered.

== Legacy ==
The genus Eisenbergiella was named after him.
