= Kazimierz Szarski =

Polish zoologist and professor

Kazimierz Witalis Szarski (9 January 1904 – 18 January 1960) was a Polish zoologist and professor at the University of Breslau who worked extensively on ornithology and wildlife conservation in Lower Silesia.

Kazimierz came from a family of noblemen and was the son of Polish economist and senator Marcin and Olga née Budwiński. After schooling at Vienna and Kraków, he graduated from the Jan Kazimierz University in Lviv in 1928 and worked for a while in the Department of Comparative Anatomy. He received a PhD in 1932, working under Kazimierz Kwietniewski on the anatomy of the urinary tract and associated glands of mice. At the end of 1938 he moved to the Jagiellonian University as assistant professor of zoology. The German invasion resulted in the closure of the university. Twenty one Polish professors of Jewish origin were shot between 3 and 4 July 1941 and Szarski narrowly escaped with his family. He had ancestors with the name Feintuch while his wife had the maiden name of Landau. Thanks to Rudolf Weigl who was a friend he was added to his laboratory as a worker. Weigl was working on serums against typhus and was treated with respect by the German war officials. But when registration of Jews was made more stringent in 1942, the family fled to Warsaw. Szarski worked in a company that produced vitamins but his wife stayed in hiding throughout the war. Most members of her family were killed. Szarski was detained during the Warsaw Uprising of 1944 and held at Fort Mokotowskie. He was moved to a transit camp at Pruszkow and then to Skierniewice. After World War II, he moved to the University of Wrocław, where he headed the Institute of Zoology.

Szarski studied the birds of the Barycz river valley and was involved in the creation of a conservation reserve there and helped establish the Krkonoše National Park in 1959. He received numerous awards including the Gold Cross of Merit (1956) and the Officer's Cross of the Order of Polonia Restituta (1959). He died from an incurable blood disease.
