= Eisenbergiella tayi =

Scientific classification
- Domain: Bacteria
- Kingdom: Bacillati
- Phylum: Bacillota
- Class: Clostridia
- Order: Eubacteriales
- Family: Lachnospiraceae
- Genus: Eisenbergiella
- Species: E. tayi

Binomial name
- Eisenbergiella tayi Amir et al. 2013

Species of bacterium

Eisenbergiella tayi is a species of bacteria first isolated from human blood. It is anaerobic, rod-shaped, and non-motile. It is the first member of the proposed genus Eisenbergiella.
