= Marian Jedlicki =

Polish lawyer, historian, and professor

Marian Zygmunt Jedlicki (born 30 April 1899 in Kielce, died 14 March 1954 in Poznań) was a Polish lawyer, historian and a professor at the Jagiellonian University in Kraków and the University of Poznań. He is well known for his translation of the Thietmar Chronicle, an early 11th century document (Jedlicki's translation of the chronicle into Polish was published in 1953. It was later translated into English).

Jedlicki finished the Sobieski Gymnasium in Kraków. After the German invasion of Poland he managed to leave Poland and wrote his works while abroad under the pseudonym "S.M. Marvey".

After the war he was the Chair of the Modern History Department and the Department of Law and Administration at the University of Kraków (Jagiellonian University). He was moved by the communist authorities to the University of Poznań, a less prestigious institution, in 1949, because he was perceived as harboring "anti-communist sympathies".
