= Lviv Institute for Typhus and Virus Research =

Research centre active in World War Era Poland

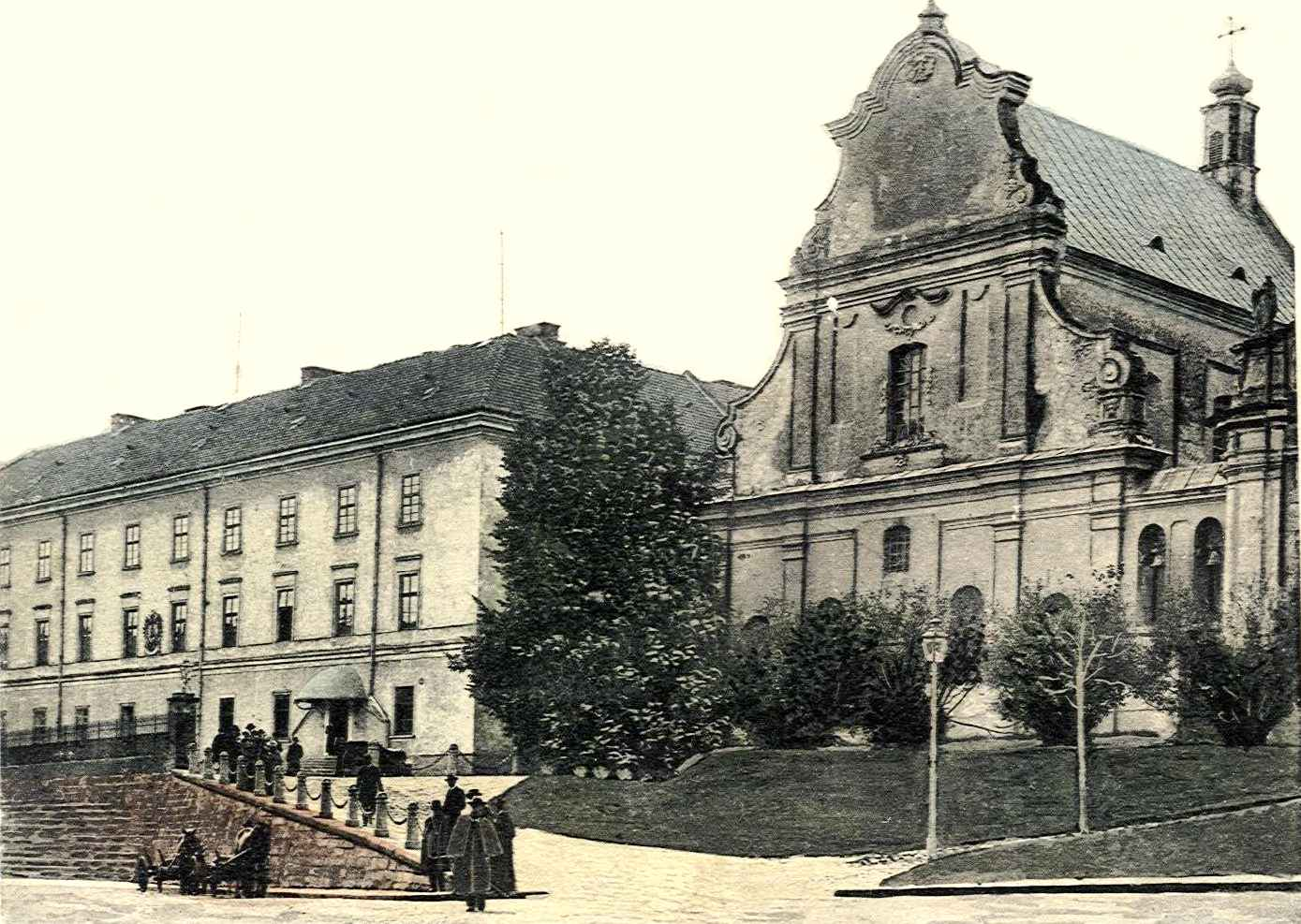
On the right, the building where Weigl's institute was located.

The Institute for Typhus and Virus Research was a scientific research centre founded in the city of Lwów, now known as Lviv. Between 1920 and 1939, it was part of Jan Kazimierz University's Biology Department. Research into a typhus vaccine was started in 1920 by parasitologist Rudolf Weigl. Weigl developed the first widely-used typhus vaccine by using human louse-feeders.

After the Nazi invasion of Poland and subsequent German occupation, the Institute became a Nazi laboratory tasked with increasing production of the typhus vaccine for the use of the German army.

During the Nazi occupation of the city, louse-feeding became the primary means of support and protection for many of the city's Polish intellectuals, including Weigl's wife and collaborator Zofia, the mathematician Stefan Banach and the poet Zbigniew Herbert. Louse-feeders were human sources of blood for lice infected with typhus, which were then used to research possible vaccines against the disease. While the profession carried a significant risk of infection, louse-feeders were given additional food rations, were protected from being shipped to slave labour camps and German concentration camps, and were permitted to move around the occupied city.

Typhus research involving human subjects, who were purposely infected with the disease, was also carried out in various Nazi concentration camps, in particular at Buchenwald and Sachsenhausen and to a lesser extent at Auschwitz.

== In popular culture ==
The Institute is portrayed in Andrzej Żuławski's film The Third Part of the Night.
