= Dziennik Polski =

Polish daily newspaper

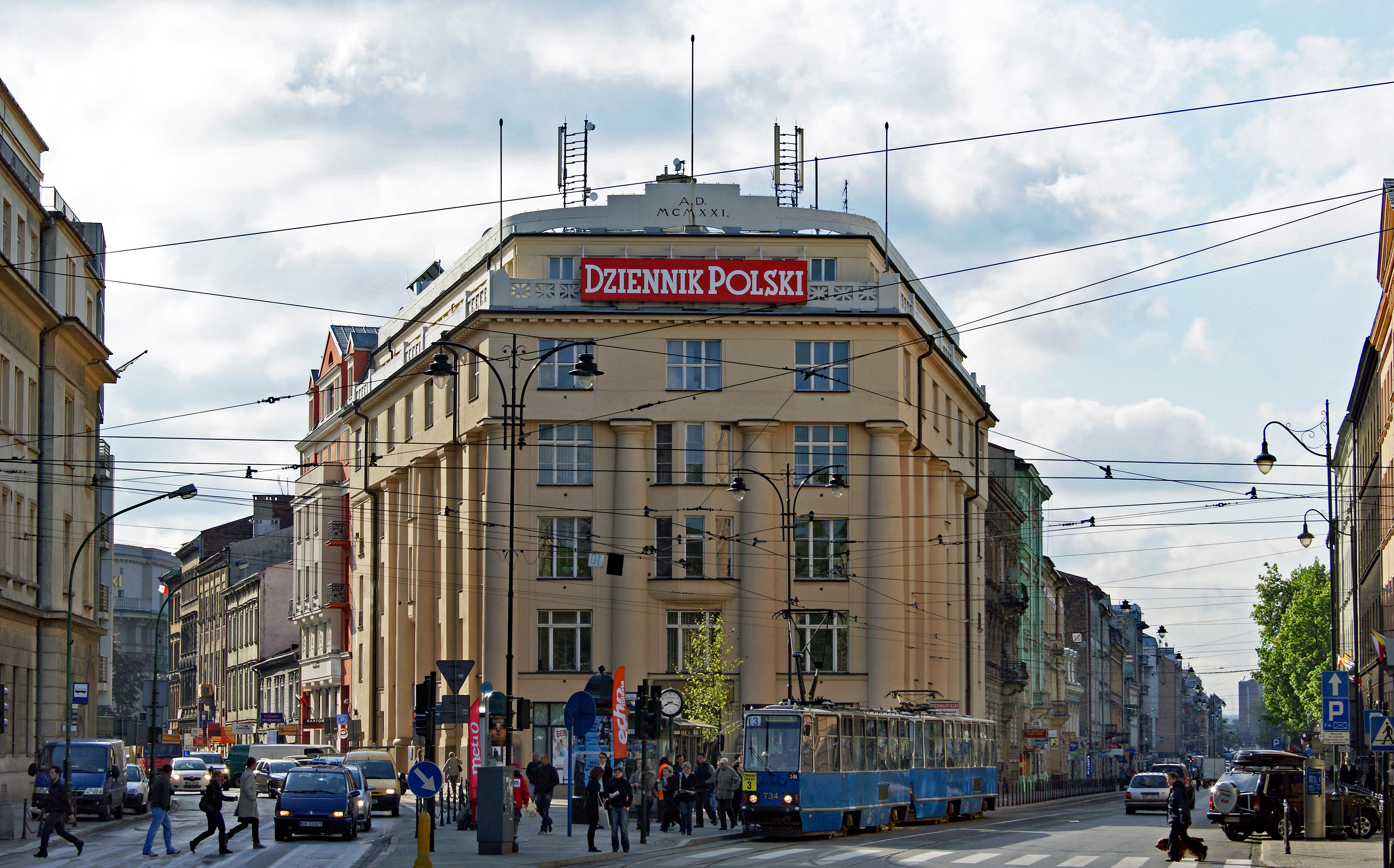
- Pałac Prasy, the headquarters of the newspaper from 1945 to 2011
- Type: Daily newspaper
- Owner: Polska Press
- Editor-in-chief: Piotr Rąpalski
- Founded: 1945; 80 years ago
- Language: Polish
- Headquarters: Kraków, Poland
- Circulation: 39,500 (2011)
- ISSN: 0137-9089
- Website: dziennikpolski24.pl

Dziennik Polski (Polish pronunciation: [ˈd͡ʑɛn.ɲik ˈpɔl.ski/]) is a Polish daily newspaper based in Kraków. Established in early 1945 following Kraków's liberation from German occupation, it serves as a regional newspaper for the Lesser Poland region. It is currently owned by Polska Press.

== History ==
When Kraków was liberated from German occupation on 18 January 1945, the provisional government sought to reestablish the press as soon as possible. After recruiting journalists and establishing a headquarters at Pałac Prasy, the first issue of the newspaper, then titled Dziennika Krakowskiego, was published by the Czytelnik Publishing House on 25 January 1945. Eight issues of Dziennika Krakowskiego were published before the newspaper's name was changed to Dziennik Polski on 4 February 1945.

Editor-in-chief Stanisław Witold Balicki sought to establish the newspaper as a literary magazine. Wisława Szymborska's debut poem, Szukam słowa, was published in Dziennik Polski on 14 March 1945. The newspaper also featured debut works from poets Jerzy Harasymowicz and Tadeusz Nowak, as well as first editions of novels by Jerzy Broszkiewicz, Władysław Machejek, Tadeusz Kwiatkowski, and Jan Wiktor.

In mid-2011, Dziennik Polski was acquired by Polska Press, and its headquarters was moved from Pałac Prasy to Aleja Pokoju. Following Orlen's acquisition of Polska Press in March 2021, Wojciech Mucha was appointed editor-in-chief, taking over from Jerzy Sułowski, who had been in the position since 2019. Mucha resigned in November 2022, and was temporarily replaced by Arkadiusz Rogowski. Maciej Kwaśniewski served as editor-in-chief from January 2023 to his resignation in April 2024; he was then replaced by Piotr Rąpalski.
