= Eisenbergiella =

Scientific classification
- Domain: Bacteria
- Kingdom: Bacillati
- Phylum: Bacillota
- Class: Clostridia
- Order: Eubacteriales
- Family: Lachnospiraceae
- Genus: Eisenbergiella; Amir et al. 2014

Type species
- Eisenbergiella tayi Amir et al. 2014

Species
- See text

Genus of bacteria

Eisenbergiella is a genus of bacteria from the family of Lachnospiraceae.

Etymology

Eisenbergiella, named in memory of the Polish physician and bacteriologist Dr Filip Eisenberg (1876-1942) who perished during the Holocaust.

== Phylogeny ==
The currently accepted taxonomy is based on the List of Prokaryotic names with Standing in Nomenclature (LPSN) and National Center for Biotechnology Information (NCBI)

16S rRNA based LTP_10_2024

- Eisenbergiella
  - E. porci
  - E. tayi

120 marker proteins based GTDB 09-RS220

- Eisenbergiella
  - - E. porci Wylensek et al. 2021 [incl. "Eisenbergiella massiliensis" Togo et al. 2016]
    - E. tayi Amir et al. 2014
  - - "Ca. C. merdipullorum" Gilroy et al. 2021
    - - "Ca. C. merdavium" Gilroy et al. 2021
      - - - "Ca. C. intestinigallinarum" Gilroy et al. 2021
          - "Ca. C. stercoravium" Gilroy et al. 2021
        - - "Ca. C. intestinipullorum" Gilroy et al. 2021
          - - "Ca. C. pullistercoris" Gilroy et al. 2021
            - "Ca. C. stercorigallinarum" Gilroy et al. 2021

Unassigned species:

- "E. longa" Huang et al. 2024

== See also ==
- List of bacterial orders
- List of bacteria genera
