= Mariusz Ziółko =

Polish Professor of automatics and signal processing

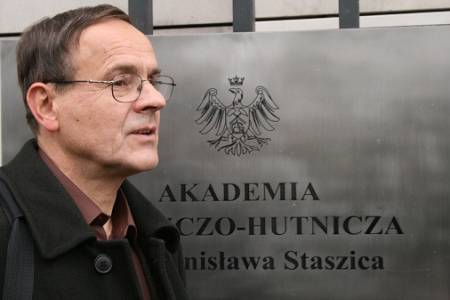
- Born: Mariusz Darko; September 18, 1946; Hamburg
- Education: AGH University of Science and Technology
- Spouse: Anna
- Children: Marcin and Bartosz
- Website: https://techmo.pl/index_eng.html

Mariusz Ziółko (born September 18, 1946, in Hamburg) is a Polish Professor of automatics and signal processing. He graduated in 1970 from AGH University of Science and Technology, where he also received PhD in 1973 and habilitation in 1990. In 2001 he received a title of a professor of technical studies from a president of Poland. He was a DAAD stipendist at University of Wuppertal. He was a visiting professor at Fachhochule St. Pölten at Austria in 2005. He is a professor in AGH Department of Electronics, where he leads a Digital Signal Processing Group. He was a member of several scientific organisations including IEEE, SIAM, EURASIP, ISCA and a chair of several conferences. He is a coauthor of pioneer publications from mathematical optimization models in biology. His works had also an important impact on Polish speech recognition technologies.

== Chosen publications ==
- M.Ziółko, J.Kozłowski: Evolution of Body Size: an Optimization Model. Mathematical Biosciences, vol.64, pp. 127–143, 1983.
- J.Kozłowski, M.Ziółko: Gradual Transition from Vegetative to Reproductive Growth Is Optimal When the Maximum Rate of Reproductive Growth Is Limited. Theoretical Population Biology, vol.34, no.2, pp. 118–129, 1988.
- M.Konarzewski, J.Kozłowski, M.Ziółko: Optimal Allocation Energy to Growth of the Alimentary Tract In Birds. Functional Ecology, vol.3, pp. 589–596, 1989.
- M.Ziółko: Application of Lyapunov Functionals to Studying Stability of Linear Hyperbolic Systems. IEEE Trans. Automat. Contr., vol.35, no.10, pp. 1173–1176, 1990.
- M.Ziółko, J.Kozłowski: Some Optimization Models of Growth in Biology. IEEE Trans. Automat. Contr., vol.40, no.10, pp. 1779–1783, 1995.
- M.Ziółko: Stability of Method of Characteristics. Applied Numerical Mathematics, vol.31, pp. 463–486, 1999.
- M.Ziółko, J.A.Pietrzyk, J.Grabska-Chrząstowska: Accuracy of Hemodialysis Modeling. Kidney International, vol.57, pp. 1152–1163, 2000.
- M.Ziółko, S.Białas: Robust Stability of D-symmetrizable Hyperbolic Systems. Bulletin of the Polish Academy of Sciences, vol.49, no.1, pp. 167–176, 2001.
- S.Białas, M.Ziółko: Necessary and Sufficient Conditions for Robust D-symmetrizability of Matrices. Bulletin of the Polish Academy of Sciences, vol.49, no.1, pp. 177–182, 2001.
- B.Ziółko, S.Manandhar, R.C.Wilson, M.Ziółko: LogitBoost Weka Classifier Speech Segmentation. Proceedings of 2008 IEEE International Conference on Multimedia & Expo, Hannover, Germany, 2008.
- B.Ziółko, S.Manandhar, R.C.Wilson, M.Ziółko: Evaluation of Errors in Polish Phones Segmentation for Different Types of Transitions. Proceedings of the 15th IEEE Mediterranean Electrotechnical Conference MELECON, Valletta, Malta, 2010.
- R.Samborski, M.Ziółko, B.Ziółko, J.Gałka: Wiener Filtration for Speech Extraction from the Intentionally Corrupted Signals. Proceedings of the 2010 IEEE International Symposium on Industrial Electronics, pp. 1698–1701. Bari, Italy.
- M.Ziółko, J.Gałka, B.Ziółko, T.Drwięga: Perceptual Wavelet Decomposition for Speech Segmentation, Proceedings of INTERSPEECH 2010, Makuhari, Japan, 2010.
- B. Ziółko, S. Manandhar, R. C. Wilson, M. Ziółko, „Phoneme Segmentation Based on Wavelet Spectra Analysis” Archives of Acoustics, 2011, vol. 36, No. 1.
- B. Ziółko, M. Ziółko, „Time Durations of Phonemes in Polish Language for Speech and Speaker Recognition”, Lecture Notes in Computer Science, 2011.
- B. Ziółko, M. Ziółko, "Przetwarzanie mowy" [Eng. Speech Processing], Wydawnictwa AGH, 2011.
- M. Ziółko, J. Gałka, B. Ziołko, T. Jadczyk, D. Skurzok, M. Mąsior, "Automatic Speech Recognition System Dedicated for Polish" – Show and tell session, Interspeech 2011, Florence.
