= Tomasz Szczypiński =

Polish politician

member of Sejm 2005-2007
- In office 25 September 2005 – 2007

Personal details
- Born: 22 September 1953 (age 72)
- Party: Civic Platform

Tomasz Szczypiński (born 22 September 1953 in Kraków) is a Polish politician. He was elected to the Sejm on 25 September 2005, getting 7399 votes in 13 Kraków district as a candidate from the Civic Platform list.

He was also a member of Sejm 2001-2005.

== See also ==
- Members of Polish Sejm 2005-2007
