= Nasza Księgarnia =

Nasza Księgarnia (Our Bookstore) is the oldest publisher of children's books in Poland. Located in Warsaw, the company currently has 40 employees and an annual turnover of $11.03 million. It publishes numerous children's and educational books in the Polish language and those books have been recommended as among the best of the best... picture, children's and youth books" by the Internationale Jugendbibliothek. Beginning in 2016 it has been publishing board games.

== Company history ==
It was founded by Związek Nauczycielstwa Polskiego (English, "Polish Teachers' Union") in 1921 as a joint stock company.

In 1938 the company published the first translation (by Irena Tuwim) of A. A. Milne's Winnie the Pooh into Polish. Among the company's other Polish language editions of children's books over the years have been Astrid Lindgren's Pippi Longstocking and Tove Jansson's Moomins.

During World War II, Nasza Księgarnia continued to release new books, only changing its forms, adapting them to the conditions of underground work.

In 1945 the company was transformed into a cooperative and in 1954 it became a state-owned enterprise, initially with the name Państwowe Wydawnictwo Literatury Dziecięcej Nasza Księgarnia ("Nasz Księgarnia" State Publishing House of Children's Literature) and then, in 1960, following a decision by Ministry of Culture and Art, with the name Instytut Wydawniczy Nasza Księgarnia ("Nasza Księgarnia" Publishing Institute).

During the political and economic changes in Poland during the early 1990s the state-owned enterprise was transformed into a limited liability company. In a referendum in 1991, the staff of the publishing house decided to privatize and in 1992 the company started its activity under the new name of the Wydawnictwo "Nasza Księgarnia" ("Nasza Księgarnia" Publishing House).

The company continues to publish children's and educational books. In 2016 it entered the board game market, publishing party and family games as well as games for children.

== Book series ==
Title of the series in Polish / English translation of series title

- Bawimy sie i Uczymy (English, "We Play and Learn")
- Biblioteka Harcerza (English, "The Scout's Library")
- Biblioteka Mlodego Technika (English, "The Young Engineer's Library")
- Biblioteka Mlodych (English, "Youth Library") - this series was an inter-publisher initiative, with books in the series published by various Polish publishing houses
- Biblioteka Plomyczka
- Biblioteka Polskiego Towarzystwa Krajoznawczego: Piekno Polski
- Biblioteka Prasy (English, "Press Library")
- Biblioteka "Ruch" (English, "Movement Library")
- Klasyka Dziecieca (English, "Children's Classics")
- Klub Siedmiu Przygod (English, "The Seven Adventures Club")
- Kolekcja Jubileuszowa (English, "Jubilee Collection")
- Ksiazeczki z Misiowej Poleczki (English, "Books from Teddy Bear Poleczki")
- Miedzynarodowa Seria Ksiazek dla Dzieci Najmlodszych (English, "International Series of Books for the Youngest Children")
- Mieszkancy Naszych Wod (English, "Inhabitants of Our Waters")
- Moje Ksiazeczki (English, "My Books")
- Od Ksiazeczki do Biblioteczki (English, "From the Books to the Bookcase")
- Poczytaj Mi Mamo (English, "Read to Me, Mum")
- Stalo Sie Jutro (English, "It Happened Tomorrow")
- Swiat w Obrazach (English, "The World in Pictures")
- Teatr Szkolny (English, "School Theatre" or "School Drama")
- Technika Wokol Nas (English, "Technology Around Us")
- Teoria i Krytyka Literatury dla Dzieci i Mlodziezy (English, "Theory and Criticism of Literature for Children and Young People")
- Ze Swiata Przyrody (English, "From the World of Nature")
- Z Praktyki Szkolnej (English, "On School Practice")
