= German concentration camps =

German concentration camps may refer to different camps which were operated by German states:

- Concentration camps during the Herero and Nama genocide
  - Shark Island concentration camp
- Cottbus-Sielow concentration camp in Cottbus interning Jewish immigrants in interwar Germany
- Stargard concentration camp in Stargard, interning Jewish immigrants in interwar Germany
- Nazi concentration camps, operated by Nazi Germany from 1933 to 1945
- Other types of Nazi camps, operated by Nazi Germany from 1933 to 1945
  - Extermination camps
  - Forced-labor camps
  - Polenlager
  - Transit camps (Nazi Germany), such as Drancy transit camp

It may also refer to Rheinwiesenlager, camps used to hold captured German soldiers at the close of the Second World War.
