= Rudolf Weigl =

Polish biologist, physician, and inventor (1883–1957)

- Rudolf Weigl in his laboratory
- Born: 2 September 1883; Prerau, Austria-Hungary
- Died: 11 August 1957 (aged 73); Zakopane, Poland
- Resting place: Rakowicki Cemetery, Kraków, Poland
- Known for: Inventor of vaccine against epidemic typhus
- Spouse: Zofia Weigl
- Awards: Righteous Among the Nations (2003)
- Scientific career
- Fields: Biology
- Workplaces: University of Lwów; Jagiellonian University of Kraków; University of Poznań

Rudolf Stefan Jan Weigl (2 September 1883 – 11 August 1957) was a Polish biologist, physician and inventor, known for creating the first effective vaccine against epidemic typhus. He was nominated for the Nobel Prize in Medicine each year between 1930 and 1934, and from 1936 to 1939.

Weigl worked during the Holocaust to save the lives of countless Jews by developing the vaccine for typhus and providing shelter to protect those suffering under the Nazi Germans in occupied Poland. For his contributions, he was named a Righteous Among the Nations in 2003.

== Life ==
Weigl was born in Prerau, which at the time was part of the Austro-Hungarian Empire, to Austrian parents, of Austro-Moravian descent. When he was a child, his father died in a bicycle accident. His mother, Elisabeth Kroesel, married a Polish secondary-school teacher, Józef Trojnar. Weigl was raised in Jasło, Poland. Although he was a native German speaker, when the family moved to Poland, he adopted the Polish language and culture.

Later, the family moved to Lviv (Lwów in Polish, Lemberg in German and Yiddish), where in 1907 Weigl graduated from the biology department at the Lwów University, at which he had been a pupil of Professors Benedykt Dybowski (1833–1930) and J. Nusbaum–Hilarowicz (1859–1917). After graduation, Weigl became Nusbaum's assistant, and in 1913 he completed his habilitation which effectively gave him tenure. He then received his doctorate degrees in zoology, comparative anatomy, and histology.

After the outbreak of World War I in 1914, Weigl was drafted into the medical service of the Austro-Hungarian army and began research on typhus and its causes. Weigl worked at a military hospital in Przemyśl, where he supervised the Laboratory for the Study of Spotted Typhus from 1918 to 1920. In 1919, he became a member of a military sanitary council in the Polish army. As he began researching and experimenting, he developed a vaccine.

After the invasion of Poland by Germany in 1939, Weigl continued his research and work at an institution in Lwów. There, he was able to increase the production of his typhus vaccine. He spent the next four years in Lwów focusing on developing a vaccine for spotted fever. He directed the Institute for Typhus and Virus Research based in Lwów. Weigl created a vaccine for spotted fever. While the vaccine did not provide full immunity against the disease, it substantially reduced the symptoms.

During the Nazi German occupation of Poland in World War II, Weigl's research attracted the attention of the Nazis. When they occupied Lwów, they ordered him to set up a typhus vaccine production plant at his Institute. Weigl hired several Jewish friends and colleagues for the plant. Weigl employed and protected approximately 2,000 Polish intellectuals, Jews and members of the Polish underground. Many of these people he hired assisted him in his typhus research and experiments with lice. Many of his Jewish associates primarily helped grow the lice and in return, they received food, protection, and doses of the vaccine when it was fully developed. His vaccines were smuggled into ghettos in Lwów and Warsaw, various concentration camps, and even certain Gestapo prisons. It was estimated that Weigl was able to save around 5,000 lives during the Nazis' reign by employing them in his Institute.

== Vaccine development ==
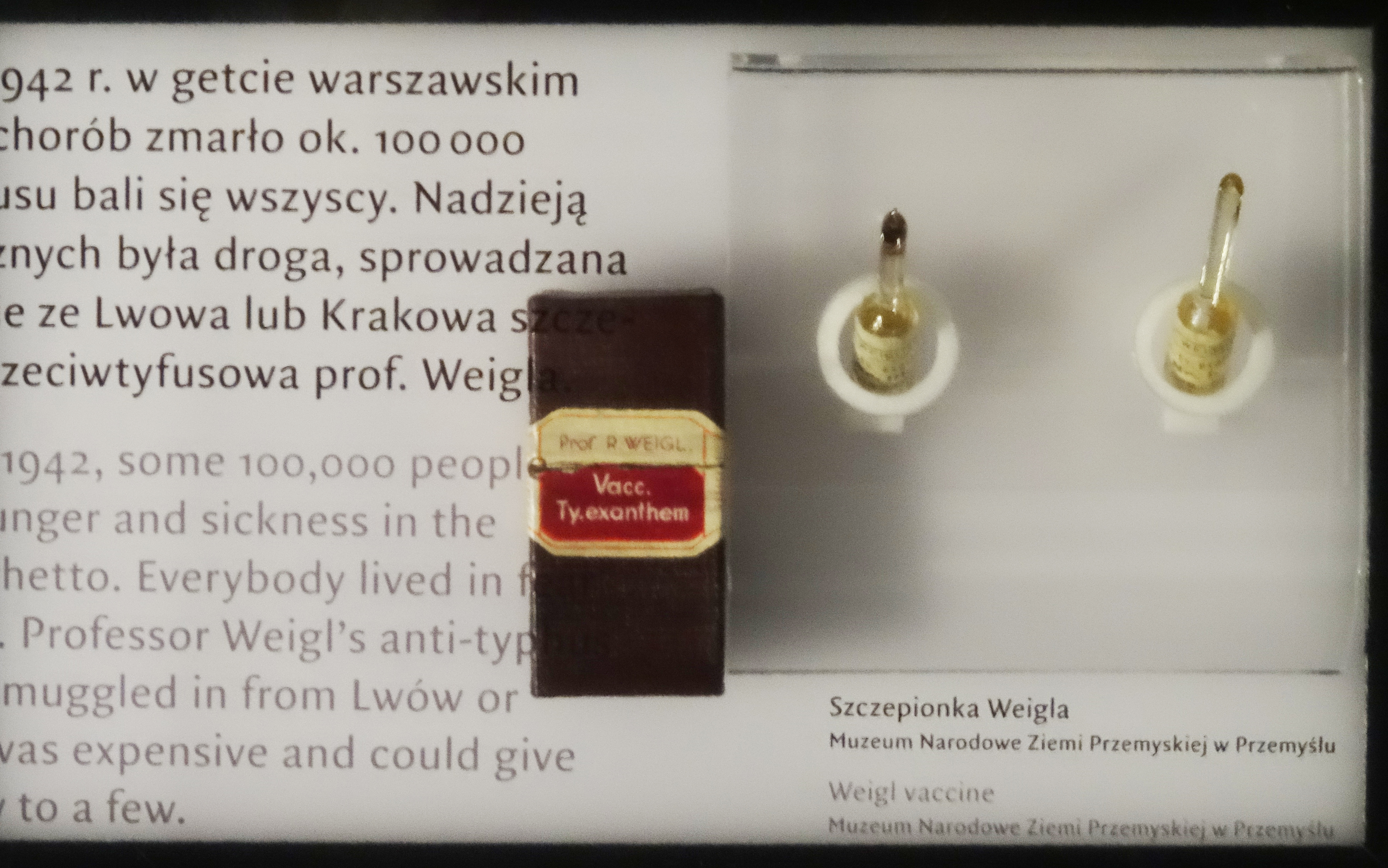
Prof. Rudolf Weigl's anti-typhus vaccine at POLIN Museum of the History of Polish Jews in Warsaw

In 1930, following Charles Nicolle's 1909 discovery that lice were the vector of epidemic typhus, and following the work done on a vaccine for the closely related Rocky Mountain spotted fever, Weigl took the next step and developed a technique to produce a typhus vaccine by growing infected lice and crushing them into a vaccine paste. He discovered that a vaccine could be developed from lice stomachs infected with Rickettsia prowazeki, the causative agent of typhus in humans. He developed this first version of the vaccine in 1918 and began experimenting on guinea pigs and even human volunteers. He refined this technique over the years until 1933 when he performed large-scale testing to cultivate bacteria and experiment with the lice using a micro-infection strategy. The method comprised four major steps:

- Growing healthy lice, for about 12 days;
- Injecting them with typhus;
- Growing them more, for 5 additional days;
- Extracting the lice's midguts and grinding them into a paste (which was the vaccine).

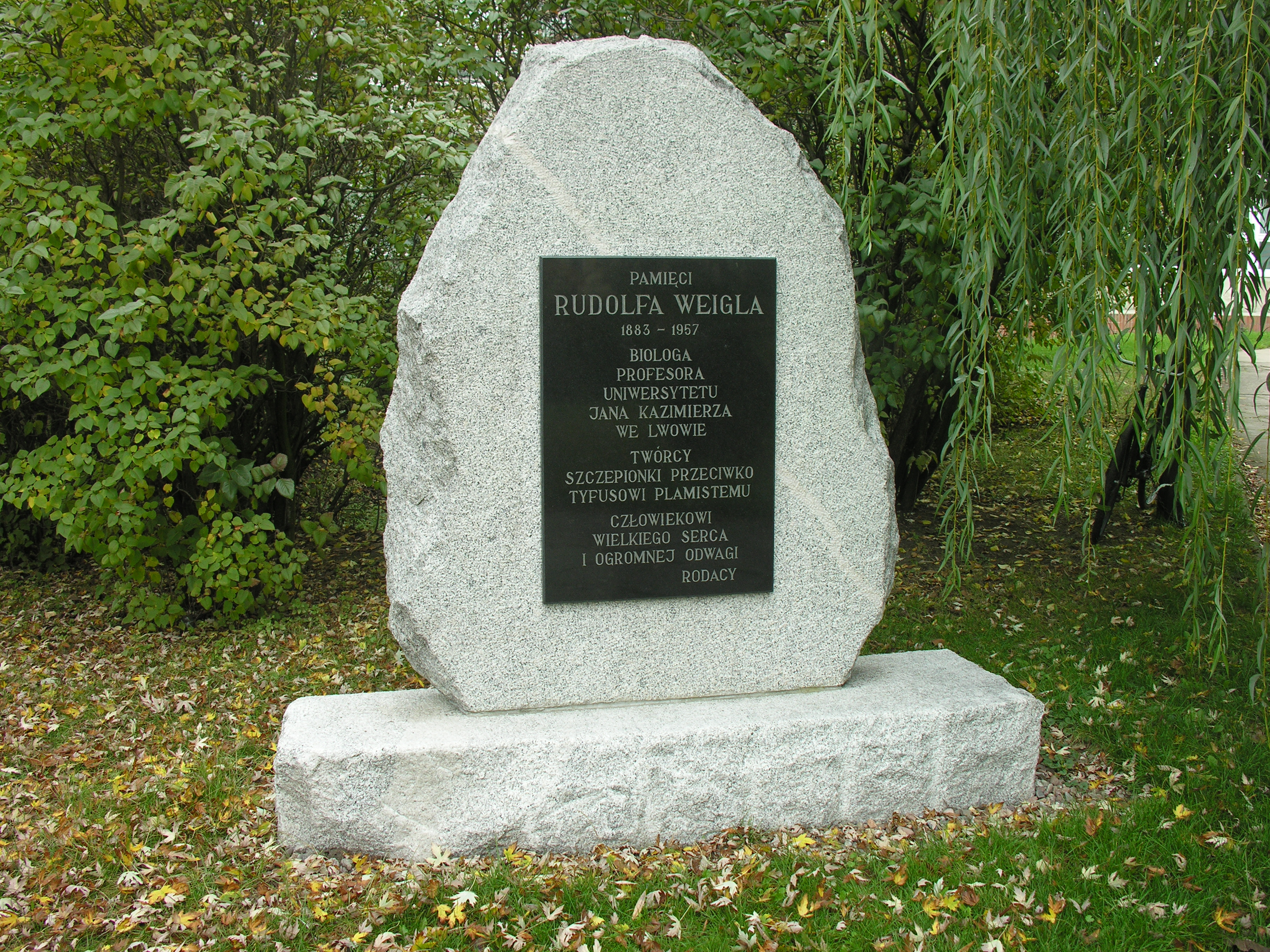
Weigl Monument in Wrocław, Poland

Growing lice meant feeding them blood, the more human the better. At first he tested his method on guinea pigs, but around 1933 he began large-scale testing on humans, feeding the lice human blood by letting them suck human legs through a screen. This could cause typhus during the latter phase, when the lice were infected. He alleviated this problem by vaccinating the human "injectees", which successfully protected them from death (though some did develop the disease). Weigl and his wife Zofia Weigl were some of the earliest lice feeders. He developed the disease, but recovered.

The first major application of his vaccine was conducted between 1936 and 1943 by Belgian missionaries in China. Soon, the vaccines were also administered in Africa. The vaccine was dangerous to produce and hard to make on a large scale. Over time, other vaccines were developed that were less dangerous and more economical to produce, including the Cox vaccine developed on egg yolk.

== Later years, death, and legacy ==
Following the border changes in the aftermath of the war, Weigl moved to Kraków in southern Poland. He was appointed chair of the General Microbiology Institute at the Jagiellonian University, and later chair of biology in the medical faculty at the University of Poznań. He retired in 1951, but production of his vaccine continued for several years.

Weigl died on 11 August 1957 in the Polish mountain resort of Zakopane at age 73. He was buried at the historic Rakowicki Cemetery in Kraków.

For Weigl's research and work with typhus at Lwów University, Weigl's Institute was created in the typhus research department. The institute features prominently in Andrzej Żuławski's 1971 film, The Third Part of the Night.

== Awards and honors ==
Weigl was continuously nominated for a Nobel Prize in the years 1930–1934 and 1936–1939. Despite these nominations, he never received a Nobel Prize for his vaccine accomplishments or social work.

A half-century after his death, Weigl's research, work, and service were recognized by many. In 2003, he was honored as Righteous Among the Nations. This award was given by Israel and commemorated his work for saving countless Jewish lives during World War II.

On 2 September 2021, Google commemorated Weigl's 138th birthday with a Google Doodle.

== See also ==
- List of Poles
- Louse-feeder
- Ludwik Fleck
- Ludwik Hirszfeld, microbiologist, Holocaust survivor

== Bibliography ==
- Allen, Arthur (2015). 'The Fantastic Laboratory of Dr. Weigl: How Two Brave Scientists Battled Typhus and Sabotaged the Nazis. New York: W.W. Norton & Company. ISBN 9780393244014. OCLC 915589490 – via the Internet Archive.
- Flamm, Heinz (2 December 2014). "Das Fleckfieber und die Erfindung seiner Serodiagnose und Impfung bei der k. u. k. Armee im Ersten Weltkrieg". Wiener Medizinische Wochenschrift (in German). 165 (7–8): 152–163. doi:10.1007/s10354-014-0332-7. ISSN 0043-5341. PMID 25448128.
- Krawczuk, Aleksander (1998). Cmentarz Rakowicki w Krakowie (in Polish). Kraków: Agencja Omnipress. ISBN 9788385028406. OCLC 21969299.
- Krawczyński, Wiesław (2010). Przez tundrę i tajgę po sowieckich łagrach (in Polish). Krzeszowice: Kubajak. ISBN 9788362501052. OCLC 751559144.
- Towarzystwo Miłośników Wrocławia (1998). Kalendarz Wrocławski (in Polish). Vol. V. 39. Wrocław: Prasa. OCLC 1782909.
- Wincewicz, Andrzej; Sulkowska, Mariola; Sulkowski, Stanislaw (2007). "Rudolph Weigl (1883–1957) – a scientist in Poland in wartime Plus ratio quam vis". Journal of Medical Biography. 15 (2): 111–115. doi:10.1258/j.jmb.2007.06-19. ISSN 0967-7720. PMID 17551613. S2CID 37072415.
