= Rational mechanics =

Rational mechanics may refer to:

- mécanique rationelle, a historical (19th century) term for classical mechanics
- a school of thought within physics advocated by Clifford Truesdell in the 1960s

== See also ==
- Newtonianism
- Auguste Comte
- Archive for Rational Mechanics and Analysis
- rational thermodynamics
