= Serrin =

Serrin is a surname. Notable people with the surname include:

- James Serrin (1926–2012), American mathematician
  - Meyers–Serrin theorem
- William Serrin (1939–2018), American journalist

== See also ==
- Serin (name)
