= Konstantina Trivisa =

Greek-American applied mathematician

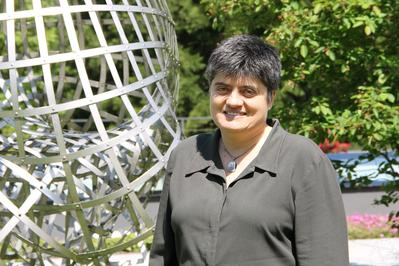
Trivisa at Oberwolfach in 2019

Konstantina Trivisa is a Greek-American applied mathematician whose research involves nonlinear partial differential equations, fluid dynamics, and the mathematical modeling of flocking. She is a professor of mathematics at the University of Maryland, College Park, where she directs the Institute for Physical Science & Technology.

== Education and career ==
Trivisa graduated from the University of Patras in 1990, and completed her Ph.D. at Brown University in 1996. Her dissertation, A priori estimates in hyperbolic systems of conservation laws via generalized characteristics, was supervised by Constantine Dafermos.

After postdoctoral research at Carnegie Mellon University in the Center for Nonlinear Analysis, and a term at Northwestern University as Ralph Boas Assistant Professor of Mathematics, she joined the University of Maryland in 2000. She was promoted to associate professor in 2004 and full professor in 2007. She was director of the Applied Mathematics & Statistics, and Scientific Computation Program from 2007 to 2018. She added affiliations with the Institute for Physical Science & Technology in 2008 and with the Center for Scientific Computation & Mathematical Modeling in 2017. In 2020, she became director of the Institute for Physical Science & Technology.

== Recognition ==
Trivisa won a Sloan Research Fellowship in 2001. She was a recipient of the 2003 Presidential Early Career Award for Scientists and Engineers, "for applying her expertise in applied partial differential equations to the increased understanding of a wide variety of important physical systems modeled by conservation laws". She was elected to the 2023 Class of SIAM Fellows.
