= Jerald Ericksen =

American mathematician (1924–2021)

- Born: Jerald LaVerne Ericksen; December 20, 1924; Portland, Oregon, U.S.
- Died: June 11, 2021 (aged 96)
- Education: Indiana University
- Known for: Ericksen number Ericksen–Leslie theory Doyle-Ericksen formula Rivlin–Ericksen tensor
- Awards: ISIMM Prize (2010); Timoshenko Medal (1979); Bingham Medal (1968)
- Scientific career
- Fields: Continuum mechanics Liquid crystals
- Workplaces: Johns Hopkins University; University of Minnesota
- Thesis: Some Geometrical Problems Connected with Ideal Gas Flows (1950)
- Doctoral advisor: David Gilbarg
- Doctoral students: Constantine Dafermos; Romesh Batra; Richard D. James

Jerald LaVerne Ericksen (December 20, 1924 – June 11, 2021) was an American mathematician specializing in continuum mechanics.

== Early life ==
Ericksen was born in Portland, Oregon. His father Adolf worked at a Portland creamery and became adept at judging the quality of butter. Later his father acquired a small creamery in Vancouver, Washington where the family moved. Jerald's brother A. Erwin was born there, and Jerald helped out in the creamery.

In the fall of 1942 he entered Oregon State College in Corvallis. A few months later, having reached eighteen years of age, he enlisted in the U. S. Navy. He was trained as an officer, first at University of Idaho, Pocatello, and then was transferred to NROTC at the University of Washington, Seattle. During his 85.5 weeks of training he met his future wife Marion Pook. On active duty he was part of Landing Craft Infantry, assigned the task of launching rockets to clear beaches for invasion in the Philippines. On the termination of hostilities he was shipped back to San Diego. He married Marion on February 24, 1946 and resigned from the service that summer.

== Education and career ==
Ericksen enrolled in University of Washington and was able to obtain his bachelor's degree in a year due to credits accumulated in his Navy training. He was a mathematics major and had a minor in Naval Science. His first graduate school was Oregon State where he had Howard Eves as an advisor. Ericksen went on to Indiana University Bloomington seeking to find applications, besides teaching, for his mathematical skill. There he came under the influence of David Gilbarg, Vaclav Hlavaty, Eberhard Hopf, and Max Zorn. Other influences included Bill Gustin, Tracie Thomas, and George Whaples. Most significantly, it was in Bloomington that he began to work with Clifford Truesdell who was criticizing continuum theories. In his autobiography of 2005, Ericksen says "since then I have been trying to better understand the formulation of and techniques for exploring continuum theories." Ericksen obtained his Ph.D. in 1951. Jerald and Marion began their family with daughter Lynn in Bloomington.

Research in continuum mechanics, for the U.S. Naval Research Laboratory, was conducted by a group including Ericksen, Truesdell, William Saenz, Richard Toupin, and Ronald Rivlin. Ericksen began to partake in the Society of Rheology and acted as a consultant to a polymer group in the National Bureau of Standards. He explained that HUAC officials interrogated him about communist sympathizers in the era of McCarthyism. On the other hand, he experienced joy at the birth of his son Randy.

In 1957 Ericksen received an offer from the Mechanical Engineering department of Johns Hopkins University. After a time Truesdell also moved to Johns Hopkins. A weekly seminar was organized in continuum mechanics where scholars could practice their oral presentations. Ericksen became interested in anisotropic liquids and began to develop a "properly invariant theory of a fluid with a single preferred direction". This topic attracted the interest of scientists like Bernard Coleman, James Ferguson, and Frank Matthews Leslie who were attempting to exploit liquid crystals. When Leslie joined him at Johns Hopkins they formed a small group with post-doctoral associates to study liquid crystals.

In 1982 Ericksen moved to University of Minnesota where he took a joint appointment in the School of Mathematics and the Aerospace and Mechanics Department. Starting with a lecture to a general audience he was able to start a graduate course in liquid crystals. Then with Roger Fosdick a seminar or course in continuum mechanics was developed. Further, Ericksen taught a course in Thermodynamics of Solids, which he developed into a textbook published in 1998.

He was also instrumental in the year- long program in continuum physics and partial differential equations held by the Institute for Mathematics and its Applications where Millard Beatty was a visitor.

In 1984, he received an honorary DSc from the National University of Ireland (NUI).

During his academic career he served on the editorial boards of the Journal of Rational Mechanics and Analysis, Archive for Rational Mechanics and Analysis, Journal of Elasticity, and the International Journal of Solids and Structures. In 1968 he was awarded the Bingham Medal. In 1979 he was awarded the Timoshenko Medal. In 2010 the International Society for the Interaction of Mechanics and Mathematics awarded to him the first ISIMM Prize for his exceptional contributions towards building a link between mathematics and mechanics. He received an Honorary Doctorate from Heriot-Watt University in July 1988.

Ericksen retired at age 65 and moved with Marion to Florence, Oregon. He died on June 11, 2021 at the age of 96.
