= Albrecht Bertram =

German academic

Albrecht Bertram (* October 2, 1950, in Braunschweig) is a former university professor of mechanics. He held the Chair of Strength of Materials of the Institute of Mechanics (IFME) at the Otto von Guericke University Magdeburg and is an associate professor at the Department of Continuum Mechanics and Material Theory of the Institute of Mechanics at Technische Universität Berlin.

== Life and career ==
During his career he had several guest stays at the following universities:

- Universidad Industrial de Santander, Bucaramanga, Columbia, 1983 to 1985 (lecturer)
- University of Dar es Salaam, Tansania, 1986 (guest lecturer)
- Pontifical Catholic University of Rio de Janeiro, Brasilia, 1987 (research stay)
- Ecole des Mines in Paris, Frankreich, 2005 (guest professor)
- University of Havana, Cuba, 2010 guest professor)
- University of California at Berkeley, USA, 2010 (guest scientist)

== Research focus ==
Bertram's work focuses on material modelling. The background is the continuum thermomechanically consistent development of extended approaches for engineering applications. The work covers the entire range of inelastic material behaviour with geometric non-linearity.

In addition, he deals with the basics of generalized continuum theories, especially the continua where higher gradients of the displacements are used.

== Miscellaneous ==
Bertram is considered as a representative of the so-called 'Berlin School of Continuum Mechanics'. This school is strongly influenced by works of the scientists Clifford Truesdell and Walter Noll. He is known for his precise representations based on mathematical and physical principles while avoiding purely intuitive approaches.

== Selected writings ==
- Axiomatische Einführung in die Kontinuumsmechanik, BI Wissenschaftsverlag, 1989, http://d-nb.info/891051260
- Micro-Macro-Interactions in Structured Media and Particle Systems, Springer, 2008 (as editor together with Jürgen Tomas), doi:10.1007/978-3-540-85715-0
- Elasticity and Plasticity of Large Deformations: An Introduction, Springer, 2012 (third edition), doi:10.1007/978-3-642-24615-9
- Festkörpermechanik, self-publishing, 2015 (second edition), http://edoc2.bibliothek.uni-halle.de/hs/id/26047 (together with Rainer Glüge)
- Solid Mechanics: Theory, Modeling, and Problems, Springer, 2015, doi:10.1007/978-3-319-19566-7 (together with Rainer Glüge)
- Compendium on Gradient Materials, Eigenverlag, 2019 (third edition), https://doi.org/10.13140/RG.2.2.36769.51045
- Magdeburger Vorlesungen zur Technischen Mechanik, self-publishing, 2016, http://www.redaktion.tu-berlin.de/fileadmin/fg49/publikationen/bertram/Bertram_Magdeburger_Vorlesungen_2016.pdf
- Formelsammlung zur Technischen Mechanik, self-publishing, 2016, http://www.ifm.tu-berlin.de/fileadmin/fg49/publikationen/bertram/Bertram_Formelsammlung_Techn_Mechanik_2016.pdf
