= Anja Schlömerkemper =

German applied mathematician

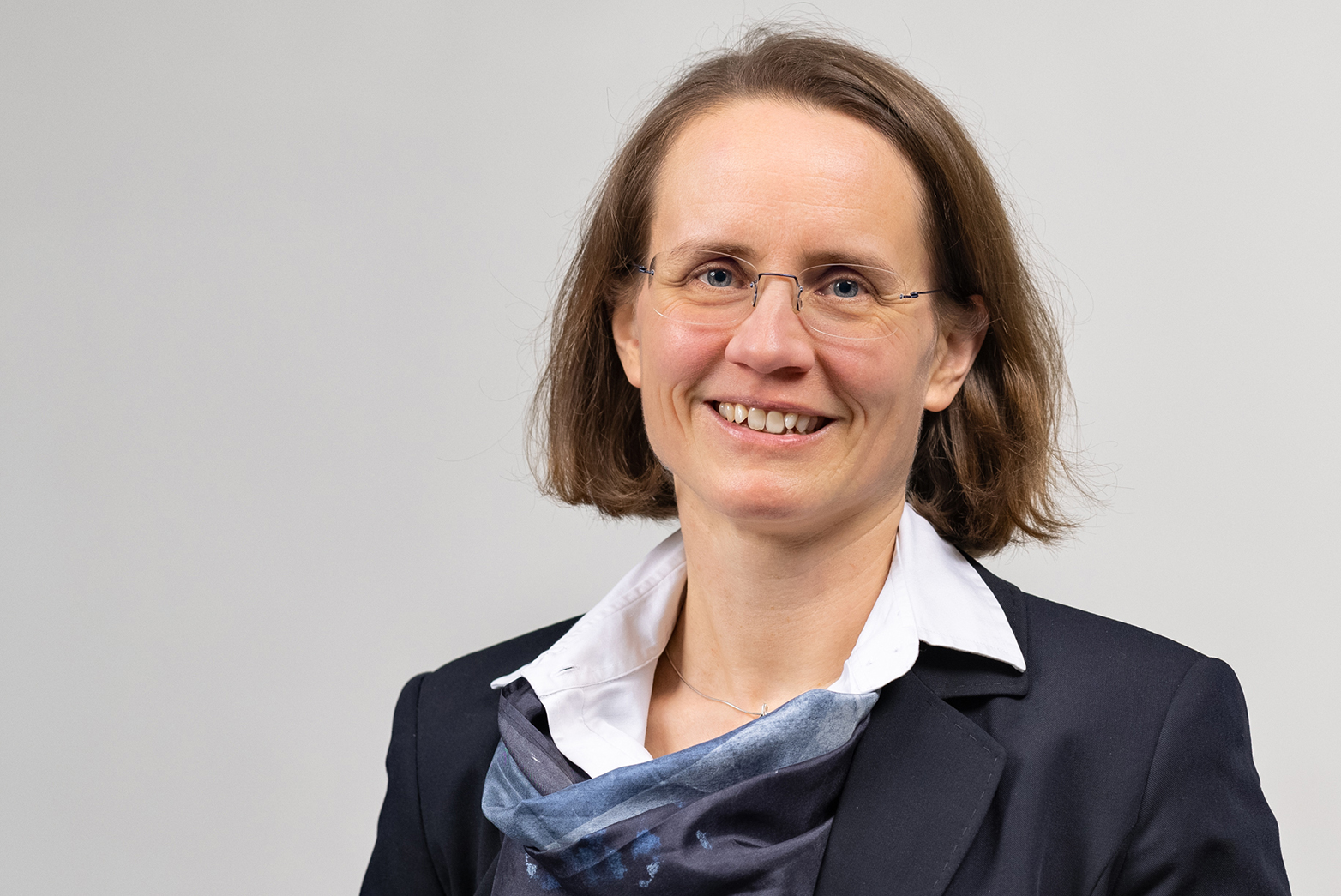
Schlömerkemper in 2021

Anja Schlömerkemper (born 1973) is a German mathematician whose research applies mathematical analysis and the calculus of variations to the solutions of partial differential equations modeling problems in materials science. She is Chair of Mathematics in the Natural Sciences at the University of Würzburg, the university's vice president for equal opportunities, career planning and sustainability, and the president of the International Society for the Interaction of Mechanics and Mathematics.

== Education and career ==
Schlömerkemper earned a diploma in physics (the German equivalent of a master's degree) in 1998 at the University of Göttingen. Continuing her studies at the University of Leipzig, she completed a doctorate in mathematics and computer science (Dr. rer. nat.) in 2002. Her doctoral dissertation, Magnetic Forces in Discrete and Continuous Systems, was jointly supervised by Stefan Müller and Andrea Braides.

She became a postdoctoral researcher, working with John M. Ball at the Mathematical Institute, University of Oxford, with Alexander Mielke at the Institute for Analysis, Dynamics and Modelling of the University of Stuttgart, and with Stefan Müller at the Max Planck Institute for Mathematics in the Sciences in Leipzig. From 2009 to 2011 she held a temporary professorship at the University of Erlangen-Nuremberg and then a research position at the University of Bonn before taking the Chair of Mathematics in the Natural Sciences in the Institute for Mathematics at the University of Würzburg in 2011.

She was named as vice president for equal opportunities, career planning and sustainability at the University of Würzburg in 2021. She also became president of the International Society for the Interaction of Mechanics and Mathematics in 2021.
