= A priori estimate =

In the theory of partial differential equations, an a priori estimate (also called an apriori estimate or a priori bound) is an estimate for the size of a solution or its derivatives of a partial differential equation. A priori is Latin for "from before" and refers to the fact that the estimate for the solution is derived before the solution is known to exist. One reason for their importance is that if one can prove an a priori estimate for solutions of a differential equation, then it is often possible to prove that solutions exist using the continuity method or a fixed point theorem.

A priori estimates were introduced and named by Sergei Natanovich Bernstein, who used them to prove existence of solutions to second order nonlinear elliptic equations in the plane. Some other early influential examples of a priori estimates include the Schauder estimates given by Juliusz Schauder, and the estimates given by De Giorgi and Nash for second order elliptic or parabolic equations in many variables, in their respective solutions to Hilbert's nineteenth problem.
