= Schauder estimates =

Collection of results for partial differential equations

In mathematics, and more precisely, in functional analysis and PDEs, the Schauder estimates are a collection of results due to Juliusz Schauder (1934, 1937) concerning the regularity of solutions to linear, uniformly elliptic partial differential equations. The estimates say that when the equation has appropriately smooth terms and appropriately smooth solutions, then the Hölder norm of the solution can be controlled in terms of the Hölder norms for the coefficient and source terms. Since these estimates assume by hypothesis the existence of a solution, they are called a priori estimates.

There is both an interior result, giving a Hölder condition for the solution in interior domains away from the boundary, and a boundary result, giving the Hölder condition for the solution in the entire domain. The former bound depends only on the spatial dimension, the equation, and the distance to the boundary; the latter depends on the smoothness of the boundary as well.

The Schauder estimates are a necessary precondition to using the method of continuity to prove the existence and regularity of solutions to the Dirichlet problem for elliptic PDEs. This result says that when the coefficients of the equation and the nature of the boundary conditions are sufficiently smooth, there is a smooth classical solution to the PDE.

== Notation ==
The Schauder estimates are given in terms of weighted Hölder norms; the notation will follow that given in the text of D. Gilbarg and Neil Trudinger (1983).

The supremum norm of a continuous function $f \in C(\Omega)$ is given by

$$|f|_{0;\Omega} = \sup_{x\in\Omega} |f(x)|$$

For a function which is Hölder continuous with exponent $\alpha$, that is to say $f \in C^{0, \alpha} (\Omega)$, the usual Hölder seminorm is given by

$$[f]_{0,\alpha;\Omega} = \sup_{x,y\in \Omega} \frac{|f(x)-f(y)|}{|x-y|^\alpha}.$$

The sum of the two is the full Hölder norm of f

$$|f|_{0,\alpha;\Omega} = |f|_{0;\Omega} + [f]_{0,\alpha;\Omega} = \sup_{x\in\Omega} |f(x)| + \sup_{x,y\in \Omega} \frac{|f(x)-f(y)|}{|x-y|^\alpha}.$$

For differentiable functions u, it is necessary to consider the higher order norms, involving derivatives. The norm in the space of functions with k continuous derivatives, $C^k(\Omega)$, is given by

$$|u|_{k;\Omega} = \sum_{|\beta| \leq k} \sup_{x\in \Omega} |D^\beta u(x)|$$

where $\beta$ ranges over all multi-indices of appropriate orders. For functions with kth order derivatives which are Hölder continuous with exponent $\alpha$, the appropriate semi-norm is given by

$$[u]_{k,\alpha;\Omega} = \sup_{\stackrel{x,y\in \Omega}{|\beta| = k}} \frac{|D^\beta u(x) - D^\beta u(y)|}{|x-y|^\alpha}$$

which gives a full norm of

$$|u|_{k,\alpha;\Omega} = |u|_{k;\Omega} + [u]_{k,\alpha;\Omega} = \sum_{|\beta| \leq k} \sup_{x\in \Omega} |D^\beta u(x)| +  \sup_{\stackrel{x,y\in \Omega}{|\beta| = k}} \frac{|D^\beta u(x) - D^\beta u(y)|}{|x-y|^\alpha}.$$

For the interior estimates, the norms are weighted by the distance to the boundary

$$d_x = d(x, \partial \Omega)$$

raised to the same power as the derivative, and the seminorms are weighted by

$$d_{x,y} = \min (d_x,d_y)$$

raised to the appropriate power. The resulting weighted interior norm for a function is given by

$$|u|^*_{k,\alpha;\Omega} = |u|^*_{k;\Omega} + [u]^*_{k,\alpha;\Omega} = \sum_{|\beta| \leq k} \sup_{x\in \Omega} |d_x^{|\beta|} D^\beta u(x)| +  \sup_{\stackrel{x,y\in \Omega}{|\beta| = k}} d_{x,y}^{k+\alpha} \frac{|D^\beta u(x) - D^\beta u(y)|}{|x-y|^\alpha}$$

It is occasionally necessary to add "extra" powers of the weight, denoted by

$$|u|^{(m)}_{k,\alpha;\Omega} = |u|^{(m)}_{k;\Omega} + [u]^{(m)}_{k,\alpha;\Omega} = \sum_{|\beta| \leq k} \sup_{x\in \Omega} |d_x^{|\beta|+m} D^\beta u(x)| +  \sup_{\stackrel{x,y\in \Omega}{|\beta| = k}} d_{x,y}^{m+k+\alpha} \frac{|D^\beta u(x) - D^\beta u(y)|}{|x-y|^\alpha}.$$

== Formulation ==
The formulations in this section are taken from the text of D. Gilbarg and Neil Trudinger (1983).

=== Interior estimates ===
Consider a bounded solution $u \in C^{2,\alpha}(\Omega)$ on the domain $\Omega$ to the elliptic, second order, partial differential equation

$$\sum_{i,j} a_{i,j}(x) D_i D_j u(x) + \sum_i b_i(x) D_i u(x) + c(x) u(x) = f(x)$$

where the source term satisfies $f\in C^\alpha(\Omega)$. If there exists a constant $\lambda > 0$ such that the $a_{i,j}$ are strictly elliptic,

$\sum a_{i,j}(x) \xi_i \xi_j \geq \lambda |\xi|^2$ for all $x\in \Omega, \xi \in \mathbb{R}^n$

and the relevant norms coefficients are all bounded by another constant $\Lambda$

$$|a_{i,j}|_{0,\alpha;\Omega}, |b_i|^{(1)}_{0,\alpha;\Omega}, |c|^{(2)}_{0,\alpha;\Omega} \leq \Lambda.$$

Then the weighted $C^{2,\alpha}$ norm of u is controlled by the supremum of u and the Hölder norm of f:

$$|u|^*_{2,\alpha;\Omega} \leq C(n,\alpha,\lambda,\Lambda) (|u|_{0,\Omega} + |f|^{(2)}_{0,\alpha;\Omega}).$$

=== Boundary estimates ===
Let $\Omega$ be a $C^{2,\alpha}$ domain (that is to say, about any point on the boundary of the domain the boundary hypersurface can be realized, after an appropriate rotation of coordinates, as a $C^{2,\alpha}$ function), with Dirichlet boundary data that coincides with a function $\phi(x)$ which is also at least $C^{2,\alpha}$. Then subject to analogous conditions on the coefficients as in the case of the interior estimate, the unweighted Hölder norm of u is controlled by the unweighted norms of the source term, the boundary data, and the supremum norm of u:

$$|u|_{2,\alpha;\Omega} \leq C(n,\alpha,\lambda,\Lambda,\Omega) (|u|_{0,\Omega} + |f|_{0,\alpha;\Omega} + |\phi|_{2,\alpha;\partial\Omega}).$$

When the solution u satisfies the maximum principle, the first factor on the right hand side can be dropped.

== See also ==
- Kellogg's theorem

== Sources ==
- Gilbarg, D.; Trudinger, Neil (1983), Elliptic Partial Differential Equations of Second Order, New York: Springer, ISBN 3-540-41160-7
- Schauder, Juliusz (1934), "Über lineare elliptische Differentialgleichungen zweiter Ordnung", Mathematische Zeitschrift (in German), vol. 38, no. 1, Berlin, Germany: Springer-Verlag, pp. 257–282, doi:10.1007/BF01170635, S2CID 120461752 MR 1545448
- Schauder, Juliusz (1937), "Numerische Abschätzungen in elliptischen linearen Differentialgleichungen" (PDF), Studia Mathematica (in German), vol. 5, Lwów, Poland: Polska Akademia Nauk. Instytut Matematyczny, pp. 34–42
- Ladyzhenskaya, Olga A.; Ural'tseva, Nina N. (1968), Linear and Quasilinear Elliptic Equations, Mathematics in Science and Engineering, vol. 46, New York and London: Academic Press, pp. xviii+495, ISBN 978-0-08-095554-4, MR 0244627, Zbl 0164.13002.
