= Method of continuity =

Procedure for determining if an operator is invertible

In the mathematics of Banach spaces, the method of continuity provides sufficient conditions for deducing the invertibility of one bounded linear operator from that of another, related operator.

== Formulation ==
Let B be a Banach space, V a normed vector space, and $(L_t)_{t\in[0,1]}$ a norm continuous family of bounded linear operators from B into V. Assume that there exists a positive constant C such that for every $t\in [0,1]$ and every $x\in B$

$$||x||_B \leq C ||L_t(x)||_V.$$

Then $L_0$ is surjective if and only if $L_1$ is surjective as well.

== Applications ==
The method of continuity is used in conjunction with a priori estimates to prove the existence of suitably regular solutions to elliptic partial differential equations.

== Proof ==
We assume that $L_0$ is surjective and show that $L_1$ is surjective as well.

Subdividing the interval [0,1] we may assume that $||L_0-L_1|| \leq 1/(3C)$. Furthermore, the surjectivity of $L_0$ implies that V is isomorphic to B and thus a Banach space. The hypothesis implies that $L_1(B) \subseteq V$ is a closed subspace.

Assume that $L_1(B) \subseteq V$ is a proper subspace. Riesz's lemma shows that there exists a $y\in V$ such that $||y||_V \leq 1$ and $\mathrm{dist}(y,L_1(B))>2/3$. Now $y=L_0(x)$ for some $x\in B$ and $||x||_B \leq C ||y||_V$ by the hypothesis. Therefore

$$||y-L_1(x)||_V = ||(L_0-L_1)(x)||_V \leq  ||L_0-L_1|| ||x||_B \leq 1/3,$$

which is a contradiction since $L_1(x) \in L_1(B)$.

== See also ==
- Schauder estimates

== Sources ==
- Gilbarg, D.; Trudinger, Neil (1983), Elliptic Partial Differential Equations of Second Order, New York: Springer, ISBN 3-540-41160-7
