= John M. Ottaway =

British chemist

Prof John Michael Ottaway FRSE FRIC FRSC (1939–1986) was a short-lived 20th century British analytical chemist. He was an expert in atomic absorption spectroscopy (AAS).

== Life ==
John Michael Ottaway was born in New Malden on 22 August 1939, the only child of John S. Ottaway and Vera (née Petherick). He studied Chemistry under Professor Bishop at the University of Exeter graduating with honours in 1961. He continued as a postgraduate studying analysis, and gaining his doctorate (PhD) in 1965. He had begun lecturing in analytical chemistry in 1963 at Exeter and in 1966 began lecturing at the University of Strathclyde. He was promoted to Senior Lecturer in 1973 and to Reader in 1977.

In 1982 he became Professor of Analytical Chemistry at Strathclyde and in the same year he was elected a Fellow of the Royal Society of Edinburgh. His proposers were Peter Pauson, John N. Sherwood, Hamish Wood, Alastair North and D. W. A. Sharp.

Ottaway married Barbara Jane Craik in Scotland in 1979. They had no children. The couple published together at Strathclyde.

Ottaway died suddenly on 20 October 1986 at Vale of Leven Hospital, Alexandria, West Dunbartonshire. He was buried on the 24 October at Cardross Crematorium.

== Publications ==
- Practical Atomic Absorption Spectrometry (1989)

He commonly wrote for the journal "Analyst"
