= International Society for the Interaction of Mechanics and Mathematics =

International Society for the Interaction of Mechanics and Mathematics (ISIMM)
- Formation: 1977
- President: Björn Kiefer
- Website: http://isimm.net/

The International Society for the Interaction of Mechanics and Mathematics (ISIMM) is an association of professional mathematicians and mechanicians dedicated to promoting the beneficial influence of each of these disciplines on the other. ISIMM organizes regular meetings and launches publications both as proceedings and as separate textbooks or monographs. Membership is subject to a recommendation by three members of ISIMM.

== History and concept in brief ==
ISIMM was founded in 1977 in Kozubnik in Southern Poland. Historically, there had been a planning period before that time which had culminated in a meeting in Lecce, Apulia, Italy two years earlier. That meeting was organized by Gaetano Fichera along with some of his colleagues from Rome and with Polish colleagues. At that time the Cold War was still on for scientists from different sides of the Iron Curtain it was not altogether easy to meet; Russian scientists, in particular, found it difficult to obtain a passport for going to a western country; but less so, if they were invited by a scientific society. Hence the idea of ISIMM came naturally, a society with an impressive constitution and with the backing of a truly international group of scientists from all over the world, even though the European element was predominant.

In its early years, the Society represented a European counterpart of The Society for Natural Philosophy founded in 1963 by Clifford Truesdell. ISIMM is presently a member of IUTAM (International Union of Theoretical and Applied Mechanics). According to its constitution, the Society seeks also cooperation with other existing international organizations such as IMU (International Mathematical Union), the SIAM (Society for Industrial and Applied Mathematics), or the ICIAM (International Council for Industrial and Applied Mathematics) which includes also some other learned societies as GAMM (Gesellschaft fur Angewandte Mathematik und Mechanik), IMA (Institute of Mathematics and its Applications), or SMAI (Société de Mathématiques Appliquées et Industrielles).

Since 2022, ISIMM is legally a non-profit organization anchored under German law as "e.V" (i.e. ‘eingetragener Verein’) registered at a responsible court in Wurzburg.

== Representatives ==
Over the years the officers of the Society – president, vice president, secretary – were:

- W. Nowacki / Th. Brooke Benjamin / H. Zorski (1978-1982)
- W. Fiszdon / G. Capriz / C. Dafermos (1983-1986)
- E. Kröner / G.I. Barenblatt / W. Wendland (1987-1991)
- R.J. Knops / E. Kröner / Parker (1992-1995)
- G. Capriz / R.J. Knops / C. Trimarco (1996-2000)
- I. Müller / G. Capriz / K. Wilmanski (2001-2004)
- M. Pitteri / I. Müller / A. Montanaro (2005-2008)
- L. Truskinovsky / M. Pitteri / D. Bigoni (2009-2012)
- A. Visintin / L. Truskinovsky / U. Stefanelli (2013-2016)
- G. Saccomandi / A. Visintin / G. Tomassetti (2017-2020)
- A. Schlömerkemper / G. Saccomandi / P. Piovano (2021-2026)
- B. Kiefer / A. Schlömerkemper / B. Emek Abali (2026- )

== Meetings ==
ISIMM organizes regularly biennial meetings. The meetings are called STAMM, Symposia on Trends in Application of Mathematics to Mechanics. A list of the Symposia follows together with the names of the organizers, or the main organizer, in brackets:

- Lecce 1975 (G. Fichera)
- Kozubnik 1977 (H. Zorski)
- Edinburgh 1979 (R.J. Knops)
- Bratislava 1981 (J. Brilla)
- Palaiseau near Paris 1983 (Ph. Ciarlet)
- Bad Honnef 1985 (E. Kröner, K. Kirchgässner)
- Wassenaar, near The Hague 1987 (J.F. Besseling, W. Eckhaus)
- Hollabrunn near Vienna 1989 (F. Ziegler)
- Tbilisi 1991 (T. Vashakmadse) - eventually cancelled due to a civil war
- Lisbon 1994 (J.-F. Rodrigues)
- Warsaw 1996 (H. Zorski)
- Nizza 1998 (G. Iooss, O. Gues, A. Nouri)
- Galway 2000 (M.A. Hayes)
- Maiori near Naples 2002 (A. Romano)
- Seeheim-Jugenheim near Darmstadt 2004 (K. Hutter)
- Vienna 2006 (W. Schneider)
- Levico near Trento 2008 (A. Visintin)
- Schmöckwitz near Berlin 2010 (W.H. Müller, A. Mielke)
- Haifa 2012 (D. Durban)
- Poitiers 2014 (A. Miranville)
- Roma 2016 (E. Rocca, U. Stefanelli, L. Truskinovski, A. Visintin)
- Oxford 2018 (A. Goriely, F. Della Porta, C.-S. Man, R. Paroni, T. Pence, G. Saccomandi, A. Schlömerkemper, G. Tomassetti)
- Online event 2020 (A. Schlömerkemper, B. Detmann, A. Majumdar, A. Musesti, P. Piovano, G. Saccomandi, Y. Şengül Tezel)
- Brescia 2022 (A. Schlömerkemper, B. Detmann, A. Majumdar, A. Musesti, P. Piovano, G. Saccomandi, Y. Şengül Tezel)
- Wurzbürg 2024 (A. Schlömerkemper, B. Detmann, A. Majumdar, A. Musesti, P. Piovano, G. Saccomandi, Y. Şengül Tezel)
- Uppsala 2026 (B. Emek Abali, F. Rindler)

== Publications ==
A great part of the STAMM meetings gave rise to proceedings volumes or special issues of some journals:

- G. Fichera (Ed.) Trends in applications of pure mathematics to mechanics, Pitman, 1976 ISBN 9780273001294
- P.G. Ciarlet, M. Roseau (Eds.) Trends and Applications of Pure Mathematics to Mechanics, Lecture Notes in Physics , Springer, 1984 ISBN 978-3-540-12916-5
- E. Kröner, K. Kirchgässner (Eds.) Trends in Applications of Pure Mathematics to Mechanics, Lecture Notes in Physics 249, Springer, 1986 ISBN 978-3-540-16467-8 (Print) 978-3-540-39803-5 (Online)
- J.F. Besseling, W. Eckhaus (Eds.) Trends in Applications of Mathematics to Mechanics, Springer, 1988 ISBN 978-3-642-73933-0
- W. Schneider, H. Troger, F. Ziegler (Eds.) Trends in applications of mathematics to mechanics, Longman Scientific & Technical, Wiley, 1991 ISBN 9781584880356
- J.F. Rodrigues, M.M. Marques (Eds.) Trends in Applications of Mathematics to Mechanics, Chapman and Hall/CRC, 1995 ISBN 0582248744, ISBN 978-0582248748
- G. Iooss, O. Gues, A. Nouri (Eds.) Trends in Applications of Mathematics to Mechanics. Chapman and Hall/CRC, 2000 ISBN 1-58488-035-X
- P.-E. O'donoghue, J.-N. Flavin (Eds.) Symposium on Trends in the Application of Mathematics to Mechanics (STAMM 2000), Elsevier ISBN 978-2842992453
- S. Rionero, G. Romano (Eds.) Trends in Applications of Mathematics to Mechanics (STAMM 2002), Springer, 2005 ISBN 978-88-470-0354-5
- Y. Wang, K. Hutter (Eds.) Trends in Applications of Mathematics to Mechanics (STAMM 2004), Shaker Verlag, Aachen, 2025
- Special issue: "Symposium on trends in applications of mathematics to mechanics (STAMM 2008)", Cont. Mech. Thermodynamics , 2009, Volume 21, Issue 2 (Eds. P. Colli, I. Mueller, A. Visintin) DOI: 10.1007/s00161-009-0110-8
- E. Rocca, U. Stefanelli, L. Truskinovsky, A. Visintin (Eds.) Trends in Applications of Mathematics to Mechanics, Springer INdAM Series 27, 2018. ISBN 978-3-319-75939-5 DOI: 10.1007/978-3-319-75940-1
- Special issue: “Mathematics & Mechanics: Natural Philosophy in the 21 Century”, Intl. J. Non-Linear Mech., 2020, Volume 123 (Eds. G. Saccomandi, A. Schlömerkemper, G. Tomassetti). DOI: 10.1016/j.ijnonlinmec.2020.103475

Apart from this, a book series IMM by Springer is conducted by this society.

== Prizes ==
Since the 2010 STAMM Meeting, the award is given once in two years at the regular STAMM conferences. The recipient of the prize is expected to have made exceptional contributions towards building a link between Mathematics and Mechanics:

- 2010 ISIMM Prize was awarded to Jerald LaVerne Ericksen
- 2012 ISIMM Prize was awarded to Ingo Müller
- 2014 ISIMM Prize was awarded to Constantine M. Dafermos
- 2016 ISIMM Prize was awarded to Roger Temam
- 2018 ISIMM Prize was awarded to Sir John M. Ball
- 2020 ISIMM Prize was awarded to Robin Knops
- 2022 ISIMM Prize was awarded to Irene Fonseca
- 2024 ISIMM Prize was awarded to Alexander Mielke
- 2026 ISIMM Prize was awarded to Francesco Dell'Isola

Apart from this, also the ISIMM Junior Prize has been established. The awardees are:

- 2014: Elisabetta Rocca and Stefan Neukamm (co-awarded)
- 2016: Antonio Segatti
- 2018: Matthias Liero
- 2020: Vito Crismale and Michele Curatolo (co-awarded)
- 2022: Manuel Friedrich
- 2024: Marco Bresciani
- 2026: Cemilio Barchiesi and Dr. Chiara Gavioli (co-awarded)
