= Frank Matthews Leslie =

Scottish mathematical physicist (1935 to 2000)

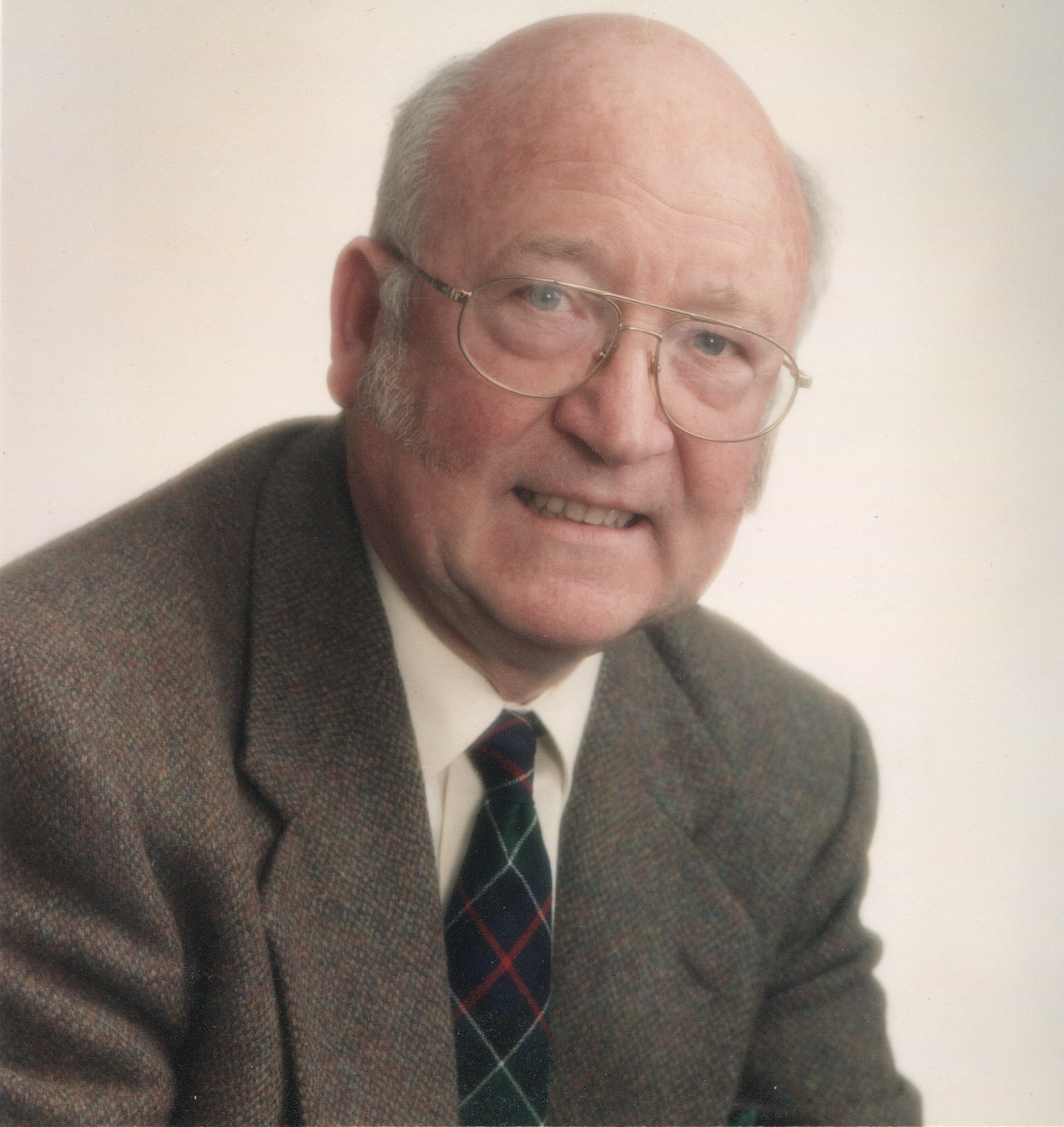
- Born: March 8, 1935; Dundee, Scotland
- Died: June 15, 2000; Glasgow, Scotland
- Education: Harris Academy; University College, Dundee; University of Manchester
- Known for: Ericksen–Leslie theory Leslie coefficients Leslie angle
- Spouse: Ellen Reoch (1965-2000)
- Scientific career
- Fields: Liquid crystals Fluid dynamics
- Workplaces: Massachusetts Institute of Technology; Newcastle University; Strathclyde University; Open University
- Thesis: I. Problems of flow in the open thermosyphon. II. Problems of viscoelasticity of liquids (1961)
- Doctoral advisor: James Lighthill; Bruce Morton

Professor Frank Matthews Leslie FRS FRSE (8 March 1935 – 15 June 2000) was a Scottish mathematical physicist specializing in continuum mechanics. He is remembered for the Ericksen–Leslie Theory which he developed with Jerald Ericksen to describe the viscosity of mesophases associated with liquid crystals. The parameters of this theory are viscosities called "Leslie coefficients", and the angle at which a (flow aligning) nematic orientates with respect to the direction of flow in a steady shear flow is called the "Leslie angle".

== Life ==
Frank Leslie was born in Dundee on 8 March 1935, the son of William Oglivy Leslie and his wife Catherine Pitkethy Matthews. His maternal grandfather Frank Rollo Matthews (1860 to 1921) was a bibliophile, acquiring a considerable library that the family treasured. Frank Leslie attended Harris Academy and University College, Dundee where he was awarded the B.Sc. in 1957. With a scholarship from the legacy of James Key Caird, he entered the University of Manchester for graduate study. Leslie's gifts for communication were soon appreciated as he became assistant lecturer in 1959. The mathematics department at University of Manchester was led by James Lighthill who had pioneered an understanding of thermosyphons. Leslie extended the work with his thesis "Problems of flow in the open thermosyphon and viscoelasticity of liquids" (1961). The external examiner was James G. Oldroyd, an authority on viscoelasticity.

As a post-doctoral student, Leslie continued his education at the Massachusetts Institute of Technology. Being interested in anisotropic fluids, he wrote to Jerald Ericksen who was at Johns Hopkins University. The collaboration with Ericksen grew from that time. A position at Newcastle University provided the setting for Leslie to begin communicating his ideas. In December 1965 his important paper "The stability of Couette flow of certain anisotropic fluids" appeared in the Mathematical Proceedings of the Cambridge Philosophical Society in which he posited a "director" vector field characterizing an anisotropic fluid.

In 1965 Leslie married Ellen Reoch; husband and wife crossed the Atlantic so Leslie and Ericksen could continue their collaboration at Johns Hopkins. Frank and Ellen had a daughter Sheena (born 1969) and a son Calum (born 1974). Frank and Ellen enjoyed playing golf.

Frank Leslie took up his permanent position at Strathclyde University in 1968, becoming a reader in 1971 and holding a personal chair from 1979 and an established chair from 1982. There he was able to host academic visitors such as Ericksen. As Chandrasekhar writes, "...the formulation of general conservation laws and constitutive equations describing the mechanical behaviour of the nematic state is due to Ericksen and Leslie. Other continuum theories have been proposed, but it turns out that the Ericksen-Leslie approach is the one that is most widely used in discussing the nematic state."

In the mid 1970s he consulted for Defence Evaluation and Research Agency at Malvern, Worcestershire with Cyril Hilsum in support of British LCD industries. Leslie demonstrated his commitment to mathematics education by serving as tutor for 20 years for the Open University.

He was Justice of the Peace (JP) for 15 years representing Bearsden and Milngavie. Leslie supported the Scottish National Party and was treasurer of the party for 14 years. Further, in 1971 Leslie was elected Elder in the Church of Scotland.

He was elected a Fellow of the Royal Society in 1995. His proposers were George Eason, Robin Knops, Donald Pack, David Butler, John N. Sherwood and Ian Sneddon.

Frank Leslie died 15 June 2000, of a pulmonary embolism after a hip replacement operation.
