= Romesh Batra =

Indian-American mechanical engineer

Romesh C. Batra
- Born: Dherowal, Punjab, British India
- Education: Thapar University; University of Waterloo; Johns Hopkins University
- Known for: Dynamic failure under shock loads, adiabatic shear bands, functionally graded materials, smart structures, nanomechanics
- Awards: ASME Robert Henry Thurston Lecture Award; Alexander von Humboldt Award; SES Engineering Science Medal
- Scientific career
- Fields: Applied mechanics, Engineering mechanics, continuum mechanics
- Workplaces: Virginia Polytechnic Institute and State University; Missouri University of Science and Technology
- Doctoral advisor: J. L. Ericksen

Romesh C. Batra is an Indian-American mechanical engineer who is a University Distinguished Professor and the Clifton C. Garvin Professor of Engineering Science and Mechanics at Virginia Polytechnic Institute and State University (Virginia Tech) in Blacksburg, Virginia. An international leader in applied mechanics, he is best known for his research on material failure under extreme loadings, for which he received the American Society of Mechanical Engineers (ASME) 2016 Robert Henry Thurston Lecture Award, one of the mechanical engineering's most prestigious honors.

== Early life and education ==
Batra was born in the village of Dherowal, Punjab, in British India (now in Pakistan). Following the partition and Indian independence, his family migrated to Shahabad Markanda, Haryana, India.

He earned a bachelor's degree in mechanical engineering at Thapar University in India, a master's degree in mechanical engineering at the University of Waterloo in Canada, and a doctoral degree in mechanics and materials at Johns Hopkins University, where he studied under elastician J. L. Ericksen. He subsequently held postdoctoral positions with Ericksen at Johns Hopkins and with Mark Levinson at McMaster University.

== Career ==
From 1976 to 1994, Batra was a faculty member at the Missouri University of Science and Technology (then the University of Missouri–Rolla). He joined Virginia Tech as the Clifton C. Garvin Professor in 1994, and in April 2019 the Virginia Tech Board of Visitors conferred on him the rank of University Distinguished Professor. His analytical and computational research on combat and space materials has been continuously funded by the United States Department of Defense since 1983.

== Research ==
Batra's research addresses computational mechanics and solid mechanics, with a particular emphasis on when and how materials and structures fail under extreme forces such as explosions and high-velocity impacts. Using computational modeling, his group predicts the material properties that govern structural failure and identifies how materials may be modified to enhance or delay it; these findings have informed the design of protective structures such as combat helmets, tank walls, and bulletproof vests.

His group's work spans adiabatic shear bands—narrow regions of intense plastic deformation that form during high-strain-rate loading of metallic alloys and that often precede fracture—composite structures, functionally graded materials, nanostructures, smart materials and structures, microelectromechanical systems, and finite element and meshless methods. His research on functionally graded materials has applications in pressure vessels and aerospace structures, including space shuttle tiles.

Batra has authored more than 400 peer-reviewed journal articles and a textbook on continuum mechanics used in many engineering courses, and he has advised more than 100 graduate students and postdoctoral researchers.

== Awards and honors ==
- ASME Robert Henry Thurston Lecture Award (2016), one of the highest honors in mechanical engineering
- Virginia Tech Alumni Award for Excellence in Graduate Student Advising (2016)
- Alexander von Humboldt Award for senior scientists
- ASME Honorary Membership (2015), the society's highest membership grade
- Virginia Outstanding Scientist Award, Commonwealth of Virginia (2011)
- SCHEV Outstanding Faculty Award, Commonwealth of Virginia (2010)
- Engineering Science Medal, Society of Engineering Science (2009)
- Honorary D.Sc., Thapar University (2006)

Batra is a Fellow of the American Academy of Mechanics, the American Society for Engineering Education, the Society of Engineering Science, the American Society of Mechanical Engineers, and the United States Association for Computational Mechanics. He is a founder and editor of the journal Mathematics and Mechanics of Solids.

== Teaching and Service ==
Batra has taught graduate Finite Element Method, Continuum Mechanics and Nonlinear Elasticity courses since 1974, with some lectures published on YouTube.

He is a founder and editor of the journal Mathematics & Mechanics of Solids. He served for two 5-year terms on the National Research Council Panels to review and advise areas of research in the Warhead Mechanics and the Lethality/Survivability Directorates of the Army Research Laboratory, Aberdeen, MD, USA; for one year as President of the Society of Engineering Science; for 3 years as Secretary of the American Academy of Mechanics; and for 5 years as Chair of the ASME Applied Mechanics Division's Technical Committee on Elasticity.

== See also ==
- List of University of Waterloo people
