= Rational thermodynamics =

Rational thermodynamics is a school of thought in statistical thermodynamics developed in the 1960s. Its introduction is attributed to Clifford Truesdell, Bernard Coleman and Walter Noll. The aim was to develop a mathematical model of thermodynamics that would go beyond the traditional "thermodynamics of irreversible processes" or TIP developed in the late 19th to early 20th centuries. Truesdell's "flamboyant style" and "satirical verve" caused controversy between "rational thermodynamics" and proponents of traditional thermodynamics.

== See also ==
- Archive for Rational Mechanics and Analysis
