= Schauder theorem =

Schauder theorem may refer to:

- Schauder fixed-point theorem
- A result about compact operators, see Compact operator § Properties
