= Walter Noll =

American mathematician (1925–2017)

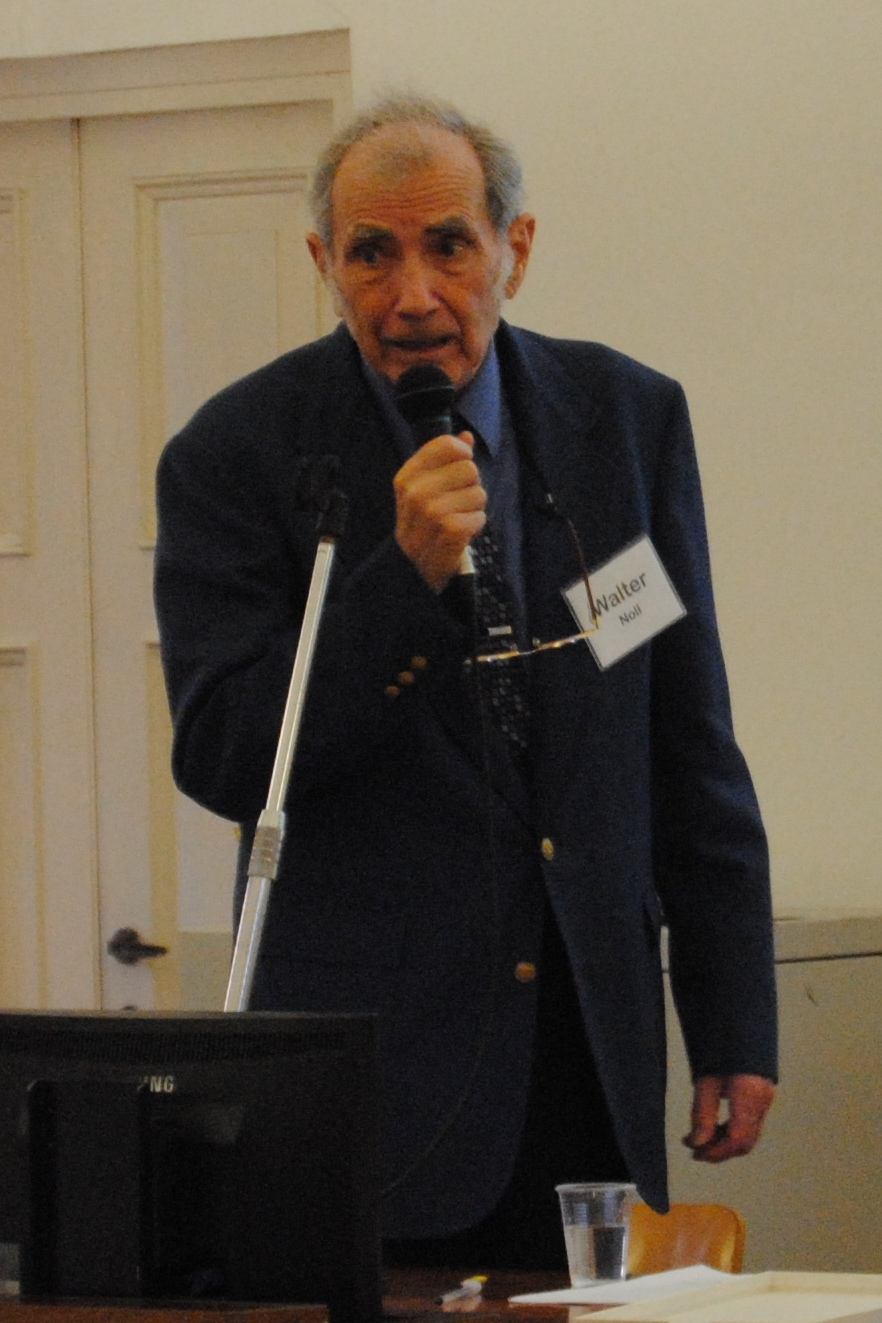
- Professor Walter Noll
- Born: January 7, 1925; Berlin, Germany
- Died: June 6, 2017 (aged 92); Pittsburgh, Pennsylvania, U.S.
- Education: Indiana University Bloomington
- Known for: Principle of material objectivity Rational thermodynamics
- Awards: American Mathematical Society Fellow (2012)
- Scientific career
- Fields: Applied mathematics, classical mechanics, thermodynamics, continuum mechanics
- Workplaces: Carnegie Mellon University
- Thesis: On the Continuity of the Solid and Fluid States (1954)
- Doctoral advisor: Clifford Truesdell
- Website: http://www.math.cmu.edu/~wn0g/

Walter Noll (January 7, 1925 – June 6, 2017) was a German mathematician, and Professor Emeritus at Carnegie Mellon University. He is best known for developing mathematical tools of classical mechanics, thermodynamics, and continuum mechanics.

== Biography ==
Born in Berlin, Weimar Germany, Noll had his school education in a suburb of Berlin. In 1954, Noll earned a Ph.D. in Applied Mathematics from Indiana University Bloomington in 1954 under Clifford Truesdell.

His thesis "On the Continuity of the Solid and Fluid States" was published both in Journal of Rational Mechanics and Analysis and in one of Truesdell's books. Noll thanks Jerald Ericksen for his critical input to the thesis.

Noll has served as a visiting professor at the Johns Hopkins University, the University of Karlsruhe, the Israel Institute of Technology, the Institut National Polytechnique de Lorraine in Nancy, the University of Pisa, the University of Pavia, and the University of Oxford.

In 2012 he became a fellow of the American Mathematical Society. Noll died on June 6, 2017, at the age of 92.

== Principle of material objectivity ==
In continuum mechanics, Noll introduced the so-called principle of material objectivity, which states that the constitutive laws governing the internal conditions of a physical system and the interactions between its parts should not depend on whatever external frame of reference is used to describe them.

"Principle of material objectivity" is now an obsolete term that has been replaced by principle of material frame-indifference.

== Books ==
- Noll, Walter and Truesdell, Clifford (1965) The Non-Linear Field Theories of Mechanics. Springer-Verlag, New York. ISBN 3-540-02779-3.
- Noll, Walter; Coleman, B. D.; and Markovitz, H. (1966) Viscometric Flows of Non-Newtonian Fluids, Theory and Experiment. Springer-Verlag, New York. ASIN B0006BN90G.
- Noll, Walter (1974) Foundations of Mechanics and Thermodynamics, Selected Papers. Springer-Verlag, New York. ISBN 0-387-06646-2.
- Noll, Walter (1987) Finite-Dimensional Spaces: Algebra, Geometry, and Analysis, Volume I. Kluwer Academic Publishers. ISBN 90-247-3581-5. A corrected version (2006) is published on Professor Noll's website.
- Noll, Walter (2004) Five Contributions to Natural Philosophy. Published on Professor Noll's website
