= Constantine Dafermos =

Greek-American mathematician (born 1941)

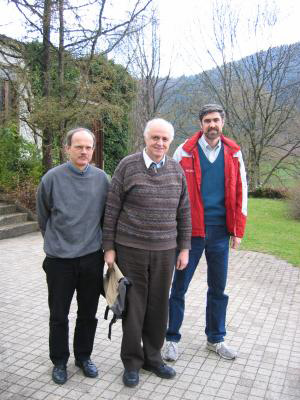
Dafermos (center) at Oberwolfach in 2004. Photo courtesy MFO

Constantine Michael Dafermos (Greek: Κωνσταντίνος Δαφέρμος; born May 26, 1941, Athens) is a Greek-American applied mathematician. He received a diploma in civil engineering from the National Technical University of Athens (1964) and a Ph.D. in mechanics from Johns Hopkins University under the direction of Jerald Ericksen (1967). He has been an assistant professor at Cornell University (1968–1971) and an associate professor (1971–1975) and professor (since 1975) in the Division of Applied Mathematics at Brown University. Since 1984, he has been the Alumni-Alumnae University Professor at Brown.

In recent years, his research has focused on nonlinear hyperbolic systems of conservation laws whose solutions spontaneously develop singularities propagating as shock waves. In particular, he is studying the interplay between thermodynamics and analysis in the theory of these systems and he is analyzing the fundamental role of entropy as a stabilizing agent.

In 2012 he became a fellow of the American Mathematical Society. In 2016 he was elected to the National Academy of Sciences.

== Awards ==
- Honorary Doctorate, University of Athens, 1987.
- Honorary Doctorate, National Technical University (Greece), 1991.
- Honorary Doctorate, University of Crete, 2001.
- SIAM W.T. and Idalia Reid Prize, 2000.
- ISIMM prize, 2014
- Norbert Wiener Prize in Applied Mathematics, 2016

== Affiliations ==
- Fellow American Academy of Arts and Sciences, 2001-.
- Correspondent Member, Academy of Athens, 1988-.
- Honorary Professor, Academia Sinica, China, 2004-.
- Member, Board of Governors, Weizmann Institute of Science (Israel), 1995-.

== Sources ==
- Brown University, The Division of Applied Mathematics (https://www.dam.brown.edu/)
