= Meyers–Serrin theorem =

In functional analysis the Meyers–Serrin theorem, named after James Serrin and Norman George Meyers, states that smooth functions are dense in the Sobolev space $W^{k,p}(\Omega)$ for arbitrary domains $\Omega \subseteq \R^n$. A domain $\Omega$ is any open, non-empty subset of $\R^n$.

== Historical relevance ==
Originally there were two spaces: $W^{k,p}(\Omega)$ defined as the set of all functions which have weak derivatives of order up to k all of which are in $L^p$ and $H^{k,p}(\Omega)$ defined as the closure of the smooth functions with respect to the corresponding Sobolev norm (obtained by summing over the $L^p$ norms of the functions and all derivatives). The theorem establishes the equivalence $W^{k,p}(\Omega)=H^{k,p}(\Omega)$ of both definitions. It is quite surprising that, in contradistinction to many other density theorems, this result does not require any smoothness of the domain $\Omega$. According to the standard reference on Sobolev spaces by Adams and Fournier (p 60): "This result, published in 1964 by Meyers and Serrin ended much confusion about the relationship of these spaces that existed in the literature before that time. It is surprising that this elementary result remained undiscovered for so long."
