= David Gilbarg =

American mathematician

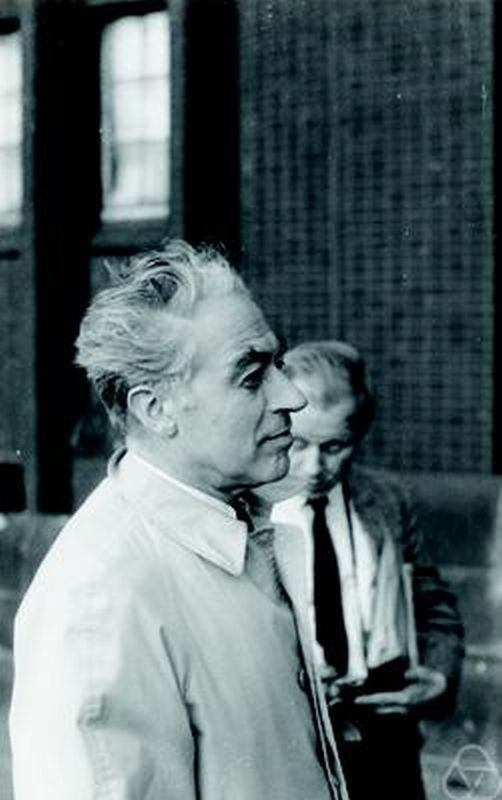
David Gilbarg

David Gilbarg (17 September 1918, Boston, Massachusetts – 20 April 2001, Palo Alto, California) was an American mathematician, and a professor emeritus at Stanford University.

He completed his Ph.D. at Indiana University in 1941; his dissertation, titled On the Structure of the group of p-adic l-units, was written under the supervision of Emil Artin.

Gilbarg was co-author, together with his student Neil Trudinger, of the book Elliptic Partial Differential Equations of Second Order. Besides Trudinger, Gilbarg's doctoral students include Jerald Ericksen and James Serrin.
