= Rivlin–Ericksen tensor =

Concept in physics

A Rivlin–Ericksen temporal evolution of the strain rate tensor such that the derivative translates and rotates with the flow field. The first-order Rivlin–Ericksen is given by

$$\mathbf{A}_{ij(1)}= \frac{\partial v_i}{\partial x_j}+\frac{\partial v_j}{\partial x_i}$$

where

$v_i$ is the fluid's velocity and
$A_{ij(n)}$ is $n$-th order Rivlin–Ericksen tensor.

Higher-order tensor may be found iteratively by the expression

$$A_{ij(n+1)}=\frac{\mathcal{D}}{\mathcal{D}t}A_{ij(n)}.$$

The derivative chosen for this expression depends on convention. The upper-convected time derivative, lower-convected time derivative, and Jaumann derivative are often used.
