= Alexander Mielke =

German mathematician (born 1958)

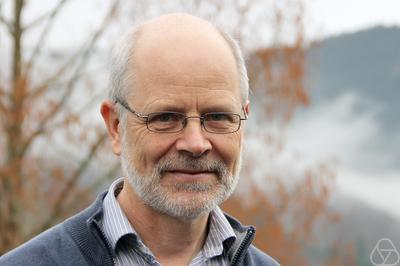
Alexander Mielke

Alexander Mielke (born 14 September 1958.) is a German mathematician working in the areas of nonlinear partial differential equations and applied analysis. He is a professor of applied analysis at the Humboldt University of Berlin and heads the research group on partial differential equations at the Weierstrass Institute.

== Education and Career ==
Mielke received his PhD from the University of Stuttgart in 1984 under the supervision of Klaus Kirchgässner, and his thesis was titled Stationary Solutions of the Euler Equation in Channels of Variable Depth. He was a postdoctoral researcher at Cornell University under the supervision of Philip Holmes between 1986 and 1987, and in 1990, he habilitated at the University of Stuttgart on the topic of Hamiltonian and Lagrangian flows on center manifolds with applications to elliptic variational problems and was appointed professor at the University of Hannover in 1992. In 1999, he was appointed at the Institute for Analysis, Dynamics, and Modeling at the University of Stuttgart. He has been a full professor at the Humboldt University of Berlin since 2004 and Head of the Research Group Partial differential equations at the Weierstrass Institute for Applied Analysis and Stochastics in Berlin.

=== Awards and honours ===
- Richard von Mises Prize of the Society of Applied Mathematics and Mechanics (GAMM), 1989.
- Heinz Maier-Leibnitz-Preis awarded by the German Research Foundation, 1989.
- ISIMM Senior prize, 2024.
