= Juliusz Schauder =

Polish mathematician (1899–1943)

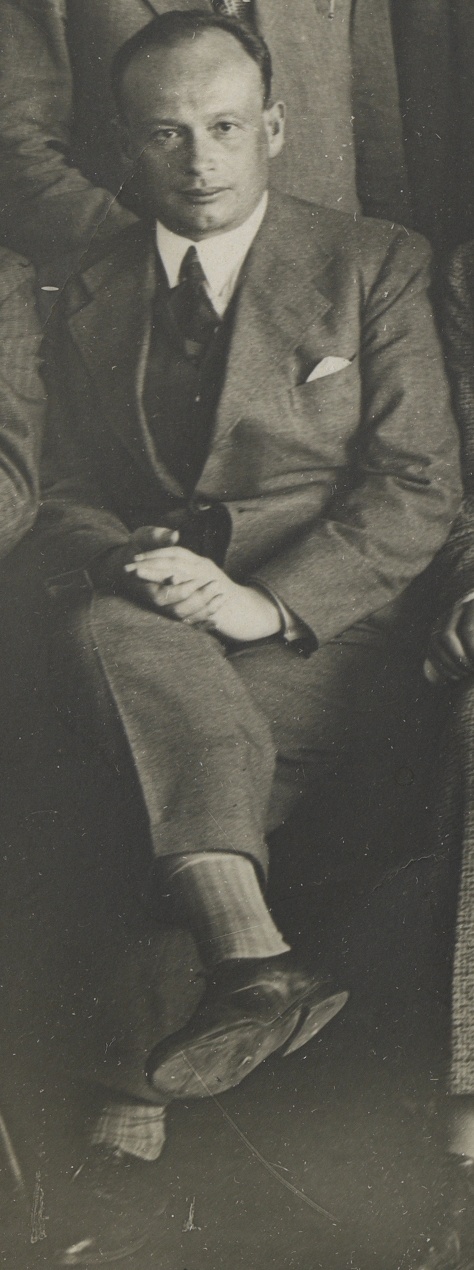
- Schauder at a topological conference in Moscow, 1935
- Born: 21 September 1899; Lemberg, Austria-Hungary
- Died: October 1943 (aged 44); Lwów, Occupied Poland
- Education: Jan Kazimierz University
- Known for: Schauder basis Schauder fixed-point theorem Schauder estimates Banach–Schauder theorem Faber-Schauder system Leray-Schauder principle Lviv School of Mathematics
- Awards: Grand Prix Internationaux de Mathématiques Malaxa (1938)
- Scientific career
- Fields: Mathematics
- Workplaces: Jan Kazimierz University
- Thesis: The Theory of Surface Measure (1923)
- Doctoral advisors: Hugo Steinhaus

Juliusz Paweł Schauder ([ˈjulʲjuʂ ˈpavɛw ˈʂau̯dɛr]; 21 September 1899 – October 1943) was a Polish mathematician known for his work in functional analysis, partial differential equations and mathematical physics. A representative of the Lwów School of Mathematics, in 1923, he received his doctoral degree from the Jan Kazimierz University in Lwów. In 1943, during World War II, he was murdered by Germans under unclear circumstances.

Concepts in mathematical literature named after him include Schauder basis, Schauder fixed-point theorem, Schauder estimates, Banach–Schauder theorem, Leray–Schauder degree, and Faber-Schauder system.

== Life and career ==
=== Early life and career ===
Born on 21 September 1899 in Lwów, then part of the Kingdom of Galicia and Lodomeria, to Samuel, a lawyer father of Jewish descent, and mother Regina, he was drafted into the Austro-Hungarian Army right after his graduation from school and saw action on the Italian front. He was captured and imprisoned in Italy. In 1918, Schauder enlisted in the Polish Blue Army organized by general Józef Haller in France. The following year, he returned with Haller's army to his hometown of Lwów, which had been besieged by Ukrainians during the Polish-Ukrainian War. The Ukrainian forces were subsequently repulsed by Poles.

Although Schauder remained in military service in Lwów until the autumn of 1919, he began taking part in the activities of the Mathematical‑Physical Society of the Jan Kazimierz University (now the University of Lviv, Ukraine) in March 1919, attending its meetings in the blue uniform of a sergeant in Haller’s army. In the same year, he officially entered the Jan Kazimierz University. In 1923, he received his doctorate based on his dissertation entitled The Theory of Surface Measure written under Hugo Steinhaus. Apart from Steinhaus, his other notable teachers included Stefan Banach, Stanisław Ruziewicz, and Eustachy Żyliński. In 1927, he obtained his habilitation based on his work Zur Theorie stetiger Abbildngen in Funktionalräume.

He got no appointment at the university and continued his research while working as a teacher at secondary schools in Lwów. As one of his pupils, Roman S. Ingarden, noted, his students quickly realized that the German word "Schauder" means "shudder" and gave him that nickname, although he in fact gained a reputation as a kind and well-liked teacher.

Due to his outstanding results, he obtained a Rockefeller Foundation scholarship in 1932 that allowed him to spend several years in Leipzig (1932–34), where he collaborated with Leon Lichtenstein and, especially, Paris. In Paris, he worked with Jacques Hadamard and started a very successful collaboration with Jean Leray. Upon returning to Lwów in 1934, he also collaborated with fellow Polish mathematician Józef Marcinkiewicz. In 1935, Schauder obtained the position of a senior assistant in the Jan Kazimierz University and the same year went to Moscow to attend an International Conference in Topology. Schauder, along with Stanisław Mazur, was an Invited Speaker of the International Congress of Mathematicians in 1936 in Oslo.

In 1938, Schauder was awarded, jointly with Leray, the inaugural Grand Prix Internationaux de Mathématiques Malaxa, established by Nicolae Malaxa, for their 1934 paper Topologie et équations fonctionelles devoted to the application of topology and theory of Banach spaces. The international jury members who conferred the award included Tullio Levi-Civita, Werner Heisenberg, and Gheorghe Țițeica. In 1939, he received a nomination for the position of "extraordinary professor" at the Jan Kazimierz University.

=== World War II and death ===
When the Soviet troops took control of Lwów, the Jan Kazimierz University was transformed into the Ivan Franko University and Schauder became professor there as well as a member of the Ukrainian Academy of Sciences. Schauder was Jewish, and after the invasion of German troops in Lwów 1941, it was impossible for him to continue his work. Even before the Lwów ghetto was established he wrote to Ludwig Bieberbach pleading for his support. Instead, Bieberbach passed his letter to the Gestapo and Schauder was arrested. In his letters to Swiss mathematicians, he wrote that he had important new results, but no paper to write them down. He was executed by the Gestapo, probably in October 1943.

After Schauder’s death, his wife Emilia (née Löwenthal) and their daughter Ewa went into hiding, including in the sewers of Lwów. Emilia was captured by the Germans and died in the Majdanek concentration camp while his daughter survived the war and was taken care of by her uncle Marian who lived in Italy.

== Contributions ==
Most of his mathematical work is in the field of functional analysis, being part of a large Polish group of mathematicians, i.e. the Lwów School of Mathematics. They were pioneers in this area with wide applications in all parts of modern analysis.

Schauder is best known for the Schauder fixed-point theorem, an extension of the Brouwer fixed-point theorem to locally convex topological vector spaces, which is a major tool to prove the existence of solutions in various problems. His other important result is the Schauder basis, which is a generalization of an orthonormal basis from Hilbert spaces to Banach spaces. The Leray−Schauder principle is a way to establish solutions of partial differential equations from a priori estimates.

The Banach–Schauder theorem is a fundamental result in functional analysis asserting that if a bounded or continuous linear operator between Banach spaces is surjective then it is an open map.

The Schauder estimates are a set of results established by Schauder concerning the regularity of solutions to linear, uniformly elliptic partial differential equations. They assert that when both the equation’s coefficients and its solutions possess sufficient smoothness, the Hölder norm of the solution can be bounded in terms of the Hölder norms of the coefficient and source terms.

== Remembrance ==
The Schauder Medal is awarded by the J.P. Schauder Center for Nonlinear Studies at the Nicolaus Copernicus University in Toruń, Poland, to individuals for their significant achievements related to topological methods in nonlinear analysis.

== See also ==
- Lwów School of Mathematics
- Warsaw School of Mathematics
- List of Polish mathematicians
