= Indiana University Mathematics Journal =

- Discipline: Mathematics
- Language: English

Publication details
- Former names: Journal of Rational Mechanics and Analysis; Journal of Mathematics and Mechanics
- History: 1952–present
- Publisher: Indiana University (USA)

Standard abbreviations
- ISO 4: Indiana Univ. Math. J.

Indexing
- CODEN: IUMJAB
- ISSN: 0022-2518 (print); 1943-5258 (web)

Links
- Journal homepage

The Indiana University Mathematics Journal is a journal of mathematics published by Indiana University. Its first volume was published in 1952, under the name Journal of Rational Mechanics and Analysis and edited by Zachery D. Paden and Clifford Truesdell. In 1957, Eberhard Hopf became editor, the journal name changed to the Journal of Mathematics and Mechanics, and Truesdell founded a separate successor journal, the Archive for Rational Mechanics and Analysis, now published by Springer-Verlag. The Journal of Mathematics and Mechanics later changed its name again to the present name.

The full text of all articles published under the various incarnations of this journal is available online from the journal's web site. The web site lists all such papers under the Indiana University Mathematics Journal name, but other bibliographies generally use the name of the journal as of the date each paper was published.
