= James Serrin =

American mathematician

- Born: November 1, 1926; Chicago, Illinois
- Died: August 23, 2012 (aged 85); Minneapolis, Minnesota
- Citizenship: American
- Education: Indiana University Bloomington
- Known for: Meyers–Serrin theorem Harnack's inequality
- Awards: ICM Speaker (1970, 1983); George David Birkhoff Prize (1973)
- Scientific career
- Fields: Mathematician
- Workplaces: University of Minnesota
- Thesis: The Existence and Uniqueness of Flows Solving Four Free Boundary Problems (1951)
- Doctoral advisor: David Gilbarg

James Burton Serrin (1 November 1926 – 23 August 2012) was an American mathematician, and a professor at University of Minnesota.

== Life ==
He graduated from Evanston Township High School in 1944. He then studied engineering and science at Northwestern University in 1944 to 1946 before transferring Western Michigan College, where he a Bachelor of Arts degree in 1947. He received his doctorate from Indiana University Bloomington in 1951 under the supervision of David Gilbarg. From 1954 till 1995, he was on the faculty of the University of Minnesota.

== Work ==
He is known for his contributions to continuum mechanics, nonlinear analysis, and partial differential equations.

== Awards and honors ==
He was elected a member of the National Academy of Sciences in 1980.

== Selected works ==
- Serrin, James (1959), "Mathematical principles of classical fluid mechanics", in Flügge, Siegfried; Truesdell, Clifford A. (eds.), Fluid Dynamics I/Strömungsmechanik I, Handbuch der Physik (Encyclopedia of Physics), vol. VIII/1, Berlin–Heidelberg–New York: Springer-Verlag, pp. 125–263, Bibcode:1959HDP.....8..125S, doi:10.1007/978-3-642-45914-6_2, ISBN 978-3-642-45916-0, MR 0108116, Zbl 0102.40503.
- Serrin, James (1959b), "On the Uniqueness of Compressible Fluid Motions", Archive for Rational Mechanics and Analysis, 3 (1): 271–288, Bibcode:1959ArRMA...3..271S, doi:10.1007/BF00284180, ISSN 0003-9527, MR 0106646, S2CID 120478897, Zbl 0089.19103.
- Serrin, James (1963), "The initial Value problem for the Navier-Stokes equations", in Langer, Rudolph E. (ed.), Nonlinear problems. Proceedings of a symposium conducted by the Mathematics Research Center, United States Army, at the University of Wisconsin, Madison, April 30-May 2, 1962., Madison: The University of Wisconsin Press, pp. 69–98, hdl:2027/uc1.b3836930, MR 0150444, Zbl 0115.08502.

== See also ==
- American mathematicians
