= Vladimír Šverák =

Czech mathematician

Vladimír Šverák (born 1959) is a Czech mathematician. Since 1990, he has been a professor at the University of Minnesota. Šverák made notable contributions to calculus of variations.

Šverák obtained his doctorate from the Charles University in Prague in 1986, under supervision of Jindřich Nečas. He worked on problems in the theory of non-linear elasticity. In 1992, he won an EMS Prize for producing a counterexample to a problem first posed by Charles B. Morrey, Jr. in 1950, whether rank-one convexity implies quasiconvexity. In 1994, Šverák was an Invited Speaker of the International Congress of Mathematicians in Zurich.

He was named to the American Academy of Arts and Sciences in 2024.
