= John Sherwood (chemist) =

British physical chemist (1933–2020)

John Neil Sherwood FRSE (8 November 1933 – 4 December 2020) was a British physical chemist, who researched organic crystals. He spent his career at the University of Strathclyde, where he was professor of chemistry (1977–2002), as well as serving as vice-principal (from 1994).

== Early life and career ==
Sherwood was born in Redruth, Cornwall on 8 November 1933, to Lily (née Rose) and William Sherwood, who taught French. He was educated at Aireborough Grammar School, near Bradford, and from 1951 studied chemistry at the University of Durham, where he gained BSc (1955), PhD (1960) and DSc (1976) degrees. His DSc thesis was entitled "Studies of the solid state".

In 1960, he joined the Royal College of Science and Technology in Glasgow – from 1964, part of the University of Strathclyde – where he was lecturer and then professor of chemistry (from 1977). He served as dean of the faculty of science, and the university's deputy principal and vice-principal (from 1994). He retired in 2002, remaining an emeritus professor in pure and applied chemistry until his death.

His research was into organic crystals, particularly their growth and the effects of imperfections. He grew large high-purity crystals of various compounds, and established a research centre at Strathclyde, the first to research growth of organic crystals. Some of his research had industrial applications, including preventing fuels from crystallising at low temperatures, ensuring the safety of explosives, and researching novel fibre-optics for use in communications.

Sherwood chaired the British Association for Crystal Growth. He was elected fellow of the Royal Society of Edinburgh in 1975, and was also a fellow of the Royal Society of Chemistry.

== Personal life and death ==
In 1958, he married Margaret Shaw (died 2020); they had two daughters. He died on 4 December 2020, at the age of 87.

== Selected publications ==
Books

- David Pugh, Kevin J. Roberts, John N. Sherwood (eds). Crystal Growth of Organic Materials (Institute of Physics, 1993) (OCLC 30445820)
- John N. Sherwood (ed.). Structure of Surfaces and Interfaces as Studied Using Synchrotron Radiation (Royal Society of Chemistry; 1990) (ISBN 9780851869971)
- John N. Sherwood (ed.). The Plastically Crystalline State: Orientationally-disordered Crystals (J. Wiley & Sons; 1979) (ISBN 9780471997153)
- John Neil Sherwood (ed.). Diffusion processes: Proceedings of the Thomas Graham Memorial Symposium, University of Strathclyde (Gordon and Breach; 1971) (OCLC 286890)
- George Murray Burnett, John Neil Sherwood, Alastair M. North (eds). Transfer and Storage of Energy by Molecules Volume 4 (Wiley-Interscience; 1969) (OCLC 32373)

Research articles

- V. Venkataramanan; S. Maheswaran; J. N. Sherwood; H. L. Bhat (1997), "Crystal growth and physical characterization of the semiorganic bis(thiourea) cadmium chloride", Journal of Crystal Growth, 179 (3–4): 605–610, Bibcode:1997JCrGr.179..605V, doi:10.1016/S0022-0248(97)00137-1
- V. Venkataramanan; G. Dhanaraj; V. K. Wadhawan; J. N. Sherwood; H. L. Bhat (1995), "Crystal growth and defects characterization of zinc tris (thiourea) sulfate: a novel metalorganic nonlinear optical crystal", Journal of Crystal Growth, 154 (1–2): 92–97, Bibcode:1995JCrGr.154...92V, doi:10.1016/0022-0248(95)00212-X
- M. Eldrup; D. Lightbody; J. N. Sherwood (1981), "The temperature dependence of positron lifetimes in solid pivalic acid", Chemical Physics, 63 (1–2): 51–58, Bibcode:1981CP.....63...51E, doi:10.1016/0301-0104(81)80307-2, S2CID 93631779
