= Archive for Rational Mechanics and Analysis =

- Discipline: Mathematics
- Language: English
- Edited by: Felix Otto and Vladimir Sverak

Publication details
- History: 1956–present
- Publisher: Springer
- Impact factor: 2.793 (2020)

Standard abbreviations
- ISO 4: Arch. Ration. Mech. Anal.

Indexing
- ISSN: 0003-9527 (print); 1432-0673 (web)
- Online archives

The Archive for Rational Mechanics and Analysis is a scientific journal that is devoted to research in mechanics as a deductive, mathematical science. The current editors in chief of the journal are Felix Otto and Vladimir Sverak. It was founded in 1956 by Clifford Truesdell when he moved from Indiana University to Johns Hopkins and lost control of a similar journal he had founded a few years previously, the Journal of Rational Mechanics and Analysis (now the Indiana University Mathematics Journal).

Gianfranco Capriz writes that Truesdell's ideals of mathematical and typesetting rigor gave the new journal a high reputation:

The Archive for Rational Mechanics and Analysis became the hallmark in the field and young scholars sought publication of their best work there as the sign of their entry into an exclusive club of perfectionists.

James Serrin, a later editor of the Archive, adds that it became the center of a revival of mechanics as an academic discipline, and that by the time of Truesdell's retirement as editor in 1989 subscribing to it was "necessary for every fine scientific library".
