= Neil Trudinger =

Australian mathematician

Neil S. Trudinger
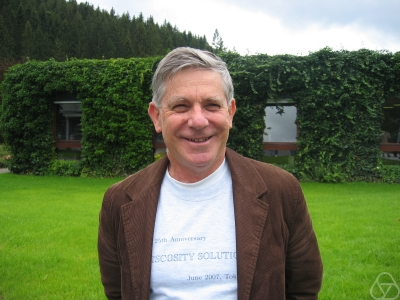
- Neil Trudinger in 2007 (photo courtesy MFO)
- Born: 20 June 1942 (age 84); Ballarat, Victoria, Australia
- Education: Stanford University; University of New England
- Scientific career
- Fields: Mathematics
- Doctoral advisor: David Gilbarg

Neil Sidney Trudinger (born 20 June 1942) is an Australian mathematician, known particularly for his work in the field of nonlinear elliptic partial differential equations.

After completing his BSc at the University of New England (Australia) in 1962, he continued his graduate studies at Stanford University. He was awarded a PhD in 1966 for his thesis Quasilinear Elliptical Partial Differential Equations in n Variables. After the award of his doctorate from Stanford University, Trudinger became a Courant Instructor at the Courant Institute of Mathematical Sciences of New York University during the academic year 1966–67. He then returned to Australia, where he was appointed as a lecturer at Macquarie University in 1967. In 1970, he moved to University of Queensland, where he was first appointed as a reader, then as professor. In 1973 he moved to the Australian National University. In 2016 he moved to the University of Wollongong, where he is currently appointed as a distinguished professor.

At the ANU Trudinger served as head of the Department of Pure Mathematics, as director of the Centre for Mathematical Analysis and as director of the Centre for Mathematics and its Applications, before becoming dean of the School of Mathematical Sciences in 1992.

He is co-author, together with his thesis advisor, David Gilbarg, of the book Elliptic Partial Differential Equations of Second Order.

== Honours ==
- 1978, elected as a fellow of the Australian Academy of Science.
- 1981, first recipient of the Australian Mathematical Society Medal.
- 1996, awarded the Hannan Medal of the Australian Academy of Science.
- 1997, elected as a Fellow of the Royal Society of London.
- 2008, awarded the Leroy P. Steele Prize for Mathematical Exposition by the American Mathematical Society.
- 2012, elected as a fellow of the American Mathematical Society.
- 2014, gave the Łojasiewicz Lecture (on the "Optimal Transportation in the 21st Century") at the Jagiellonian University in Kraków.

== See also ==
- Trudinger's theorem
- Yamabe problem
