= Clifford Truesdell =

American mathematician (1919–2000)

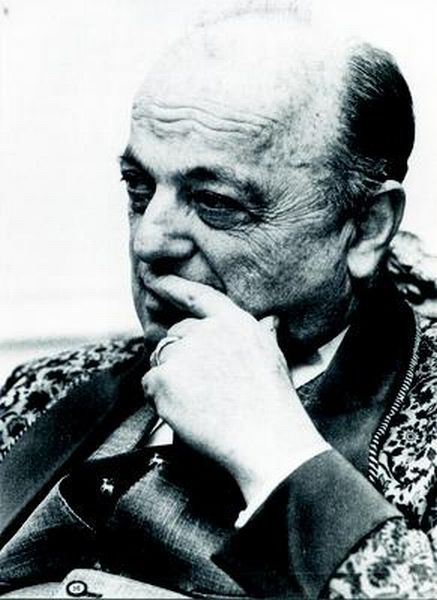
- Born: Clifford Ambrose Truesdell III; February 18, 1919; Los Angeles, California, U.S.
- Died: January 14, 2000 (aged 80); Baltimore, Maryland, U.S.
- Known for: Hypoelastic material Rational mechanics Rational thermodynamics Truesdell stress rate
- Awards: Theodore von Karman Medal (1996); George David Birkhoff Prize (1978); Bingham Medal (1963)
- Scientific career
- Fields: Mathematics; Natural philosophy History of science
- Thesis: The Membrane Theory of Shells of Revolution (1944)
- Doctoral advisor: Solomon Lefschetz; Harry Bateman
- Doctoral students: Walter Noll

Clifford Ambrose Truesdell III (February 18, 1919 – January 14, 2000) was an American mathematician, natural philosopher, and historian of science.

== Life ==
Truesdell was born in Los Angeles, California. After high school, he spent two years in Europe learning French, German, and Italian, and improving his Latin and Greek. His linguistic skills stood him in good stead in his later historical investigations. At Caltech he was deeply influenced by the teaching of Harry Bateman. In particular, a course in partial differential equations "taught me the difference between an ordinary good teacher and a great mathematician, and after that I never cared what grade I got in anything." He obtained a B.Sc. in mathematics and physics in 1941, and an MSc. in mathematics in 1942.

In 1943, he completed a Ph.D. in mathematics at Princeton University. For the rest of the decade, the U.S. Navy employed him to do mechanics research.

Truesdell taught at Indiana University 1950–61, where his students included James Serrin, Jerald Ericksen, and Walter Noll. From 1961 until his retirement in 1989, Truesdell was professor of rational mechanics at Johns Hopkins University. With Noll and Bernard David Coleman, he contributed to foundational rational mechanics, whose aim is to construct a mathematical model for treating (continuous) mechanical phenomena.

Truesdell was the founder and editor-in-chief of the journals Archive for Rational Mechanics and Analysis and Archive for History of Exact Sciences, which were unusual in several ways. Following Truesdell's criticisms of awkward style in scientific writing, the journal accepted papers in English, French, German, and Latin.

In addition to his original work in mechanics, Truesdell was a major historian of science and mathematics, editing or co-editing six volumes of the collected works of Leonhard Euler.

== Awards ==
- Bingham Medal of the Society of Rheology, 1963;
- Birkhoff Prize of the American Mathematical Society and Society for Industrial and Applied Mathematics, 1978;
- Honorary doctorate from the Faculty of Mathematics and Science at Uppsala University, Sweden 1979;
- Theodore von Karman Medal, 1996.

== Selected writings ==
- 1948: An Essay towards a Unified Theory of Special Functions, Princeton University Press
- 1952: Vorticity and the Thermodynamic State in a Gas Flow, Gauthier-Villars
- 1954: The Kinematics of Vorticity, Indiana University Press
- 1954: Rational fluid mechanics, 1687–1765, Orell Füssil
- 1966: The Elements of Continuum Mechanics, Springer-Verlag.
- 1968: Essays in the History of Mechanics, Springer-Verlag
- 1969: Rational Thermodynamics, McGraw-Hill, 1969.
- 1971: The Tragicomical History of Thermodynamics, 1822-1854. ISBN 0-387-90403-4
- 1977: A First Course in Rational Continuum Mechanics, Academic Press
- 1987: Great Scientists of Old As Heretics in "the Scientific Method", University of Virginia Press, ISBN 0-8139-1134-6.
- Classical Field Theories of Mechanics, with Toupin, vol. III/1 of Handbuch der Physik edited by Siegfried Flügge.
- "Non-linear Field Theories of Mechanics", with Walter Noll, volume III/3 of Handbuch der Physik edited by Siegfried Flügge.
- 1999: An Introduction to the Mechanics of Fluids, with K. R. Rajagopal, Birkhauser, Boston
