= Orlicz–Pettis theorem =

The Orlicz–Pettis theorem is a theorem in functional analysis concerning convergent series (Orlicz) or, equivalently, countable additivity of measures (Pettis) with values in abstract spaces.

Let $X$ be a Hausdorff locally convex topological vector space with dual $X^*$. A series $\sum_{n=1}^\infty~x_n$ is subseries convergent (in $X$), if all its subseries $\sum_{k=1}^\infty~ x_{n_k}$ are convergent. The theorem says that, equivalently,

- (i) If a series $\sum_{n=1}^\infty~x_n$ is weakly subseries convergent in $X$ (i.e., is subseries convergent in $X$ with respect to its weak topology $\sigma(X,X^*)$), then it is (subseries) convergent; or
- (ii) Let $\mathbf{A}$ be a $\sigma$-algebra of sets and let $\mu:\mathbf{A}\to X$ be an additive set function. If $\mu$ is weakly countably additive, then it is countably additive (in the original topology of the space $X$).

The history of the origins of the theorem is somewhat complicated. In numerous papers and books there are misquotations or/and misconceptions concerning the result. Assuming that $X$ is weakly sequentially complete Banach space, W. Orlicz proved the following

Theorem. If a series $\sum_{n=1}^\infty~x_n$ is weakly unconditionally Cauchy, i.e., $\sum_{n=1}^\infty |x^*(x_n)|<\infty$ for each linear functional $x^*\in X^*$, then the series is (norm) convergent in $X$.

After the paper was published, Orlicz realized that in the proof of the theorem the weak sequential completeness of $X$ was only used to guarantee the existence of the weak limits of the considered series. Consequently, assuming the existence of those limits, which amounts to the assumption of the weak subseries convergence of the series, the same proof shows that the series in norm convergent. In other words, the version (i) of the Orlicz–Pettis theorem holds. The theorem in this form, openly credited to Orlicz, appeared in Banach's monograph in the last chapter Remarques in which no proofs were provided. Pettis directly referred to Orlicz's theorem in Banach's book. Needing the result in order to show the coincidence of the weak and strong measures, he provided a proof. Also Dunford gave a proof (with a remark that it is similar to the original proof of Orlicz).

A more thorough discussion of the origins of the Orlicz–Pettis theorem and, in particular, of the paper can be found in. See also footnote 5 on p. 839 of and the comments at the end of Section 2.4 of the 2nd edition of the quoted book by Albiac and Kalton. Though in Polish, there is also an adequate comment on page 284 of the quoted monograph of Alexiewicz, Orlicz's first PhD-student, still in the occupied Lwów.

In a 1953 paper, Grothendieck proved a theorem, whose special case is the Orlicz–Pettis theorem in locally convex spaces. Later, a more direct proofs of the form (i) of the theorem in the locally convex case were provided by McArthur and Robertson.

== Orlicz-Pettis type theorems ==
The theorem of Orlicz and Pettis had been strengthened and generalized in many directions. An early survey of this area of research is Kalton's paper. A natural setting for subseries convergence is that of an Abelian topological group $X$ and a representative result of this area of research is the following theorem, called by Kalton the Graves-Labuda-Pachl Theorem.

Theorem. Let $X$ be an Abelian group and $\alpha ,\beta$ two Hausdorff group topologies on $X$ such that $(X,\beta)$ is sequentially complete, $\alpha \subset \beta$, and the identity $j:(X,\alpha)\to (X,\beta)$ is universally measurable. Then the subseries convergence for both topologies $\alpha$ and $\beta$ is the same.

As a consequence, if $(X,\beta)$ is a sequentially complete K-analytic group, then the conclusion of the theorem is true for every Hausdorff group topology $\alpha$ weaker than $\beta$. This is a generalization of an analogical result for a sequentially complete analytic group $(X,\beta)$ (in the original statement of the Andersen-Christensen theorem the assumption of sequential completeness is missing), which in turn extends the corresponding theorem of Kalton for a Polish group, a theorem that triggered this series of papers.

The limitations for this kind of results are provided by the weak* topology of the Banach space $\ell^\infty$ and the examples of F-spaces $X$ with separating dual $X^*$ such that the weak (i.e., $\sigma(X,X^*)$) subseries convergence does not imply the subseries convergence in the F-norm of the space $X$.

== Bibliography ==
- Alexiewicz, Andrzej (1969), Analiza Funkcjonalna, Państwowe Wydawnictwo Naukowe, Warszawa.
- Albiac, Fernando; Kalton, Nigel (2016), Topics in Banach space theory, 2nd ed., Springer, ISBN 9783319315553.
