= Władysław Orlicz =

Polish mathematician (1903–1990)

Władysław Roman Orlicz
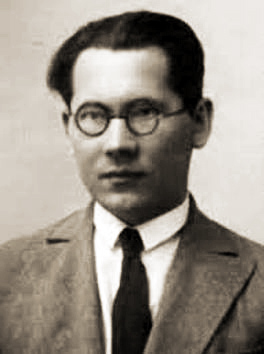
- Orlicz, before 1934
- Born: May 24, 1903; Okocim, Austria-Hungary
- Died: August 9, 1990 (aged 87); Poznań, Poland
- Citizenship: Polish
- Education: University of Lviv
- Known for: Orlicz space Orlicz sequence space Orlicz–Pettis theorem Mazur-Orlicz theorem Weighted BV functions
- Awards: Stefan Banach Prize (1948); Golden Cross of Merit (1954); Jurzykowski Prize (1973)
- Scientific career
- Fields: Mathematics
- Workplaces: Lviv Polytechnic; University of Lviv; University of Poznań
- Thesis: On the Theory of Orthogonal Series (1928)
- Doctoral advisor: Eustachy Żyliński; Hugo Steinhaus
- Doctoral students: Andrzej Alexiewicz; Feliks Barański; Zbigniew Ciesielski; Stanisław Knapowski

Władysław Roman Orlicz (Polish: [vwaˈdɨswaf ˈɔrlit͡ʂ]; May 24, 1903 – August 9, 1990) was a Polish mathematician linked to the circle of the Lwów School of Mathematics. He was a professor at the University of Poznań and a member of the Polish Academy of Sciences. From 1977 to 1979, he served as president of the Polish Mathematical Society.

He is known for his research in functional analysis, topology, vector-valued functions, orthogonal series and measure theory. Concepts named after him include Orlicz spaces and the Orlicz–Pettis theorem.

== Life and career ==
Orlicz was born on 24 May 1903 in Okocim, then part of the Kingdom of Galicia and Lodomeria within Austria-Hungary, as the third out of five children of Franciszek Orlicz and Maria (née Rossknecht). His father died when he was four years old. Orlicz attended schools in Tarnów, Znojmo (now in Czech Republic), and Lwów (now in Ukraine), where his family settled in 1919. As a student, Orlicz excelled especially in the upper grades. He graduated in 1920 from the State Second Real School in Lwów (Polish: Państwowa Druga Szkoła Realna we Lwowie) and voluntarily enlisted in the Polish Army, although he did not take part in any fighting during the Polish-Soviet War (1919–2021).

Orlicz initially enrolled at the Lwów Polytechnic but after a year he changed the university and began studying in the Department of Mathematical and Natural Sciences of the Jan Kazimierz University (now the University of Lviv). His professors included Stefan Banach, Hugo Steinhaus and Antoni Łomnicki. In 1923, still as a student, he started working at the university, first as a demonstrator, and later as a research assistant. In 1925, Orlicz finished his studies at the university but he continued his education attending Kazimierz Kuratowski's lectures at the Lwów Polytechnic.

In 1926, at the age of 23, he published his first paper on the theory of summability, which was published in the Tohoku Mathematical Journal. In 1928, Orlicz earned his doctorate under Eustachy Żyliński, based on his dissertation entitled Z teorii szeregów ortogonalnych (On the Theory of Orthogonal Series). Orlicz influenced the young mathematician Józef Marcinkiewicz through their collaboration on this subject in the mid-1930s. He was known to visit the Scottish Café and engage in mathematical discussions with many prominent mathematicians of the time. He was the author or co-author of 14 problems included in the Scottish Book.

In 1927–1929 and 1930–1931, Orlicz was employed as a teacher in a military cadet school and a private high school for girls. From 1929 to 1930, Orlicz pursued further studies in theoretical physics at the University of Göttingen after having received a scholarship from the Ministry of Religious Affairs and Public Education. His teachers included Max Born, Richard Courant, Edmund Landau, and Harald Bohr. During his stay in Göttingen, Orlicz began working with Zygmunt Birnbaum on the subject of the extension of spaces. This led to Orlicz's subsequent independent research on function spaces that generalize L^{p} spaces, now known as Orlicz spaces.

Upon his return to Lwów in 1930, Orlicz received the position of senior assistant in the Faculty of Mathematics of the Lwów Polytechnic. In 1934, he obtained his habilitation on the basis of his work in the field of orthogonal series and the following year, he was promoted to the position of assistant professor at the Lwów Polytechnic. In 1937, he became an extraordinary professor at the University of Poznań following a nomination from President Ignacy Mościcki.

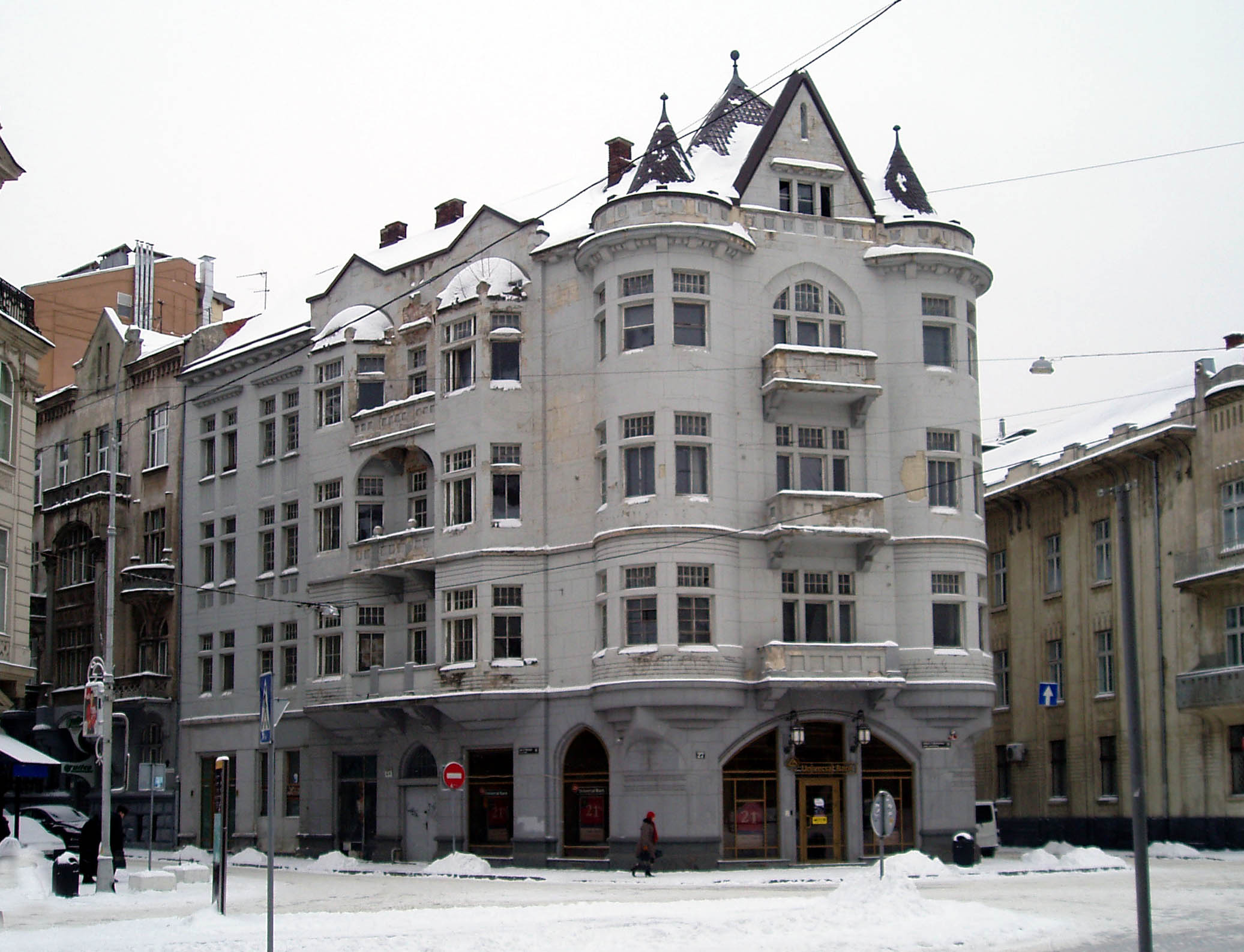
Building that used to house the original Scottish Café, now in Lviv, Ukraine

The outbreak of the World War II surprised him while he was on vacation in Lwów. Since he could not return to Poznań, he was appointed professor and continued to lecture at the Faculty of Mathematics of the University of Lwów until June 1941. During the Nazi occupation of Lwów (1941–1944), he worked at Professor Rudolf Weigl's Typhus Research Institute as a lice feeder, alongside Stefan Banach. This allowed him to avoid German repression and to support himself financially.

When the war ended, Orlicz could not remain in Lwów as the forced resettlement of Poles from the Eastern Borderlands took place. He returned to Poznań, taking over the Chair of Mathematics at the University of Poznań (now Adam Mickiewicz University). In 1948, Orlicz was awarded the title of ordinary professor.

In 1956, Orlicz became a corresponding member of the Polish Academy of Sciences, advancing to full membership in 1961. Orlicz worked at the Institute of Mathematics of the Polish Academy of Sciences until 1974 when he retired.

Orlicz was as an editor of Commentationes Mathematicae (1955–1990), and Studia Mathematica (1962–1990). He served as President of the Polish Mathematical Society from 1977 to 1979. He was also a member of the Warsaw Scientific Society and the Polish Philosophical Society.

On 23 August 1980, he was among the signatories of the Appeal of the Sixty-Four, joining prominent writers, public intellectuals, and scholars in their effort to persuade the communist authorities to engage in dialogue with the protesting workers. He continued to host a seminar "Selected Problems of Functional Analysis" at the University of Poznań until 1989. His doctoral students included Andrzej Alexiewicz, Feliks Barański, Zbigniew Ciesielski, and Stanisław Knapowski. He died on 9 August 1990 in Poznań.

== Work ==
Orlicz made significant contributions to such areas of mathematics as function spaces, orthogonal series, unconditional convergence in Banach spaces, summability, vector-valued functions, metric locally convex spaces, real functions, measure theory and integration, polynomial operators and modular spaces.

One of Orlicz's most well-known contributions to mathematics is the introduction of Orlicz spaces, a type of function spaces which generalizes L^{p} spaces. They were first formulated in his 1932 paper entitled Über eine gewisse Klasse von Räumen vom Typus B and published in Bulletin International de l’Académie Polonaise des Sciences. Stefan Banach himself had already acknowledged in his monograph published the same year that Orlicz was the first one who introduced those spaces. Orlicz spaces have found wide application in analysis, integral equations, probability, constructive function theory, differential equations, and mathematical statistics.

The Orlicz-Pettis theorem is a result in functional analysis relating to convergent series or, equivalently, countable additivity of measures with values in abstract spaces. Together with Julian Musielak, Orlicz introduced the concept in mathematical analysis known as weighted BV functions.

Other eponymous concepts appearing in the mathematical literature include the Orlicz property, Orlicz category theorem, Mazur-Orlicz theorem, Orlicz interpolation theorem, Musielak-Orlicz space, Orlicz norm, Hardy-Orlicz spaces, Marcinkiewicz-Orlicz spaces and Orlicz-Sobolev spaces.

== Awards and recognition ==
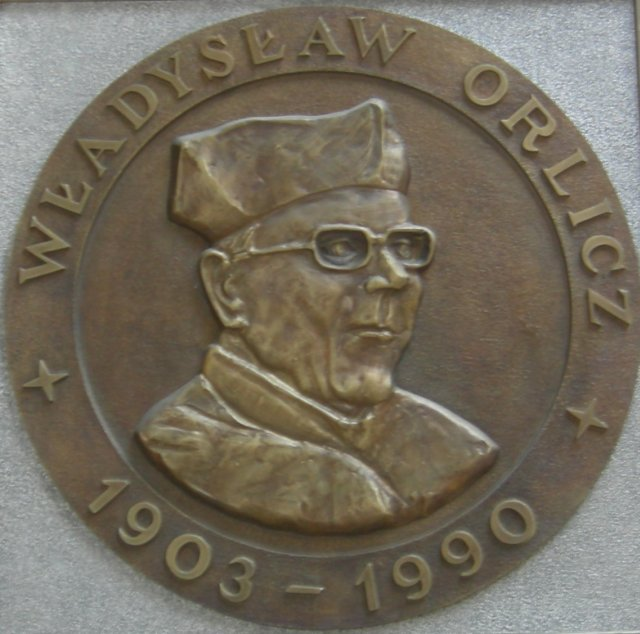
Władysław Orlicz memorial plaque in Poznań

During his scientific career Orlicz received a number of awards and state decorations including Stefan Banach Prize of the Polish Mathematical Society (1948), the Golden Cross of Merit (1954), Medal of the 10th Anniversary of People's Poland (1955), the Commander's Cross of the Order of Polonia Restituta (1958), Honorary Membership of the Polish Mathematical Society (1973), Jurzykowski Prize (1973), Copernicus Medal of the Polish Academy of Sciences (1973), the Sierpiński Medal of the University of Warsaw (1979), Medal of the Commission for National Education (1983) and the Individual State Prizes (2nd degree in 1952, 1st degree in 1966).

Orlicz participated at the International Congress of Mathematicians on four occasions: Oslo (1936), Edinburgh (1958), Stockholm (1962) and Warsaw (1983), where he served as honorary president. He authored or co-authored 171 scientific papers and oversaw 39 doctoral dissertations. His influence on the mathematical community in Poznań was immense and he is sometimes described as the founder of the Poznań School of Mathematics.

He was the recipient of honorary doctorates from York University in Canada (1974), Poznań University of Technology (1978) and Adam Mickiewicz University (1983).

The Orlicz Memorial Conference was held in March, 1991 by the University of Mississippi in Oxford, United States. Other conferences in memory of Orlicz were organized in 1998 by the Adam Mickiewicz University in Poznań, and in 2000 by the Adam Mickiewicz University and the Institute of Mathematics of the Polish Academy of Sciences in Bedlewo.

== Personal life ==
Orlicz had four brothers: Kazimierz, Tadeusz, Zbigniew and Michał. Zbigniew died in the Polish-Soviet War (1919–1921). Kazimierz, the eldest brother, perished in the Stutthof concentration camp. The remaining brothers became professors: Tadeusz specialized in timber technology while Michał in climatology and metereology.

In 1928, Orlicz married Zofia (née Krzysik). She was an assistant in the Faculty of Physics at the Jan Kazimierz University in Lwów. During World War II, she served in the Home Army and was awarded the Order of Virtuti Militari for her involvement in saving Jewish children from the Holocaust. After the war, she was persecuted by the communist authorities and spent five years in prison (1948–1953) for distributing banned press.

== See also ==
- Orlicz space
- Orlicz–Pettis theorem
- List of Polish mathematicians
