= Feliks Barański =

Polish mathematician (1915-2006)

Feliks Barański

Feliks Barański (1915-2006) was a Polish mathematician and an active member of the so-called Lwów School of Mathematics.

Born May 1915 in Lwów, Austria-Hungary (modern Lviv, Ukraine), he joined the circle of young, talented mathematicians formed around Stefan Banach and Hugo Steinhaus. He obtained his doctorate under the supervision of Władysław Orlicz. During the period of German occupation of his hometown he made his living as a lice feeder in the institute of Rudolf Weigl. Expelled from Lwow after the war, he settled in Kraków, where he joined the local Kraków University of Technology. He was also admitted into the Polish Mathematical Society.
