= Trudinger's theorem =

In mathematical analysis, Trudinger's theorem or the Trudinger inequality (also sometimes called the Moser–Trudinger inequality) is a result of functional analysis on Sobolev spaces. It is named after Neil Trudinger (and Jürgen Moser).

It provides an inequality between a certain Sobolev space norm and an Orlicz space norm of a function. The inequality is a limiting case of Sobolev embedding and can be stated as the following theorem:

Let $\Omega$ be a bounded domain in $\mathbb{R}^n$ satisfying the cone condition. Let $mp=n$ and $p>1$. Set

$$A(t)=\exp\left( t^{n/(n-m)} \right)-1.$$

Then there exists the embedding

$$W^{m,p}(\Omega)\hookrightarrow L_A(\Omega)$$

where

$$L_A(\Omega)=\left\{ u\in M_f(\Omega):\|u\|_{A,\Omega}=\inf\{ k>0:\int_\Omega A\left( \frac{|u(x)|}{k} \right)~dx\leq 1 \}<\infty \right\}.$$

The space

$$L_A(\Omega)$$

is an example of an Orlicz space.
