= Orlicz space =

Type of function space

In mathematics, and especially in harmonic analysis and functional analysis, an Orlicz space is a type of function space which generalizes L^{p} spaces. Like $L^p$ spaces, they are Banach spaces. The spaces are named for Władysław Orlicz, who was the first to define them in 1932.

Besides $L^p$ spaces, a variety of function spaces arising naturally in analysis are Orlicz spaces. One such space is $L\,\log^+\! L$, which arises in the study of Hardy–Littlewood maximal functions, consisting of measurable functions $f$ such that

$$\int_{\mathbb{R}^n} |f(x)|\log^+ |f(x)|\,dx < \infty.$$

Here $\log^+$ is the positive part of the logarithm. Also included in the class of Orlicz spaces are many of the most important Sobolev spaces. In addition, the Orlicz sequence spaces are examples of Orlicz spaces.

== Terminology ==
These spaces are called Orlicz spaces because Władysław Orlicz was the first who introduced them, in 1932. Some mathematicians, including Wojbor Woyczyński, Edwin Hewitt and Vladimir Mazya, include the name of Zygmunt Birnbaum as well, referring to his earlier joint work with Władysław Orlicz. However in the Birnbaum–Orlicz paper the Orlicz space is not introduced, neither explicitly nor implicitly, hence the name Orlicz space is preferred. By the same reasons this convention has been also openly criticized by another mathematician (and an expert in the history of Orlicz spaces), Lech Maligranda. Orlicz was confirmed as the person who introduced Orlicz spaces already by Stefan Banach in his 1932 monograph.

== Definition ==
Let $\mu$ be a σ-finite measure on a set $X$, and $\Phi: [0, \infty) \to [0, \infty]$ a Young function; i.e., a convex, lower semicontinuous, and non-trivial function. Non-trivial in the sense that it is neither the zero function $x \mapsto 0$ nor the convex dual of the zero function

$$x \mapsto \begin{cases} \,\,\,0 & \text{ if } x = 0, \\ +\infty & \text{ otherwise.}\end{cases}$$

Now let $L^\dagger_\Phi$ be the set of measurable functions $f:X\to\R$ such that the integral

$$\int_X \Phi(|f|)\, d\mu$$

is finite, where, as usual, functions that agree almost everywhere are identified.

This is not necessarily a vector space (for example, it might fail to be closed under scalar multiplication). The Orlicz space, denoted $L_\Phi$, is the vector space of functions spanned by $L^\dagger_\Phi$; that is, the smallest linear space containing $L^\dagger_\Phi$. Formally,

$$L_{\Phi} = \left\{f \;\bigg\vert \int_X \Phi(k|f|)\, d\mu < \infty \text{ for some }k>0\right\}.$$

There is another Orlicz space, the small Orlicz space, defined by

$$M_{\Phi} = \left\{f \;\bigg\vert \int_X \Phi(k|f|)\, d\mu < \infty \text{ for all }k>0 \right\}.$$

In other words, it is the largest linear space contained in $L^\dagger_\Phi$.

=== Norm ===
To define a norm on $L_\Phi$, let $\Psi$ be the complementary Young function to $\Phi$; i.e.,

$$\Psi(x) = \int_0^x (\Phi')^{-1}(t)\, dt.$$

Note that Young's inequality for products holds:

$$ab\le \Phi(a) + \Psi(b).$$

The norm is then given by

$$\|f\|_\Phi = \sup\left\{\|fg\|_1 \,\bigg\vert \int \Psi(|g|)\, d\mu \le 1\right\}.$$

Furthermore, the space $L_\Phi$ is precisely the space of measurable functions for which this norm is finite.

An equivalent norm, called the Luxemburg norm, is defined on $L_\Phi$ by

$$\|f\|'_\Phi = \inf\left\{k\in (0,\infty)\,\bigg\vert\int_X \Phi(|f|/k)\,d\mu\le 1 \right\},$$

and likewise $L_\Phi(\mu)$ is the space of all measurable functions for which this norm is finite.

The two norms are equivalent in the sense that $\| f \|_{\Phi}' \leq \| f \|_{\Phi} \leq 2 \| f \|_{\Phi}'$ for all measurable $f$.

Note that by the monotone convergence theorem, if $0 < \|f\|_\Phi' < \infty$, then

$$\int_X \Phi(|f|/\|f\|_{\Phi}')\,d\mu\le 1$$.

== Examples ==
For any $p \in [1, \infty]$, $L^p$ space is an Orlicz space with Orlicz function $\Phi (t) = t^p$. Here

$$t^\infty = \begin{cases} 0 &\text{ if } t \in [0, 1], \\ +\infty &\text{ else.} \end{cases}$$

When $1 < p < \infty$, the small and the large Orlicz spaces for $\Phi(t) = t^p$ are equal: $M_{\Phi} \simeq L_{\Phi}$.

For an example where $L^\dagger_\Phi$ is not a vector space, and is strictly smaller than $L_\Phi$, let $X$ be the open unit interval $(0,1)$, $\Phi(t)=e^t-1-t$, and $f(t) = \log(t)$. Then $af$ is in the space $L_\Phi$ for all $a\in\R$ but is only in $L^\dagger_\Phi$ if $|a|< 1$.

== Properties ==
Proposition. The Orlicz norm is a norm.

Proof. Since $\Phi(x) > 0$ for some $x > 0$, we have $\|f \|_{\Phi} = 0 \to f = 0$ a.e.. That $\|kf\|_{\Phi} = |k| \|f\|_{\Phi}$ is obvious by definition. For triangular inequality, we have:
$$\begin{aligned}
& \int_{\mathcal{X}} \Phi\left(\frac{f+g}{\|f\|_\Phi+\|g\|_\Phi}\right) d \mu \\
= & \int_{\mathcal{X}} \Phi\left(\frac{\|f\|_\Phi}{\|f\|_\Phi+\|g\|_\Phi} \frac{f}{\|f\|_\Phi}+\frac{\|g\|_\Phi}{\|f\|_\Phi+\|g\|_\Phi} \frac{g}{\|g\|_\Phi}\right) d \mu \\
\leq & \frac{\|f\|_\Phi}{\|f\|_\Phi+\|g\|_\Phi} \int_{\mathcal{X}} \Phi\left(\frac{f}{\|f\|_\Phi}\right) d \mu+\frac{\|g\|_\Phi}{\|f\|_\Phi+\|g\|_\Phi} \int_{\mathcal{X}} \Phi\left(\frac{g}{\|g\|_\Phi}\right) d \mu \\
\leq & 1
\end{aligned}$$
Theorem. The Orlicz space $L^\varphi (X)$ is a Banach space — a complete normed vector space.

Theorem. $M_\Phi, L_{\Phi^*}$ are topological dual Banach spaces.

In particular, if $M_{\Phi} = L_{\Phi}$, then $L_{\Phi^*}, L_{\Phi}$ are topological dual spaces. In particular, $L^p, L^q$ are dual Banach spaces when $1/p + 1/q = 1$ and $1 < p < \infty$.

== Relations to Sobolev spaces ==
Certain Sobolev spaces are embedded in Orlicz spaces: for $n>1$ and $X \subseteq \mathbb{R}^{n}$ open and bounded with Lipschitz boundary $\partial X$, we have

$$W_0^{1, n} (X) \subseteq L^\varphi (X)$$

for

$$\varphi (t) := \exp \left( | t |^{n / (n - 1)} \right) - 1.$$

This is the analytical content of the Trudinger inequality: For $X \subseteq \mathbb{R}^{n}$ open and bounded with Lipschitz boundary $\partial X$, consider the space $W_0^{k, p} (X)$ with $k p = n$ and $p > 1$. Then there exist constants $C_1, C_2 > 0$ such that

$$\int_X \exp \left( \left( \frac{| u(x) |}{C_1 \| \mathrm{D}^k u \|_{L^p (X)}} \right)^{n / (n - k)} \right) \, \mathrm{d} x \leq C_2 | X |.$$

== Orlicz norm of a random variable ==
Similarly, the Orlicz norm of a random variable characterizes it as follows:

$$\|X\|_\Psi \triangleq  \inf\left\{k\in (0,\infty)\mid \operatorname{E}[ \Psi(|X|/k)] \le 1 \right\}.$$

This norm is homogeneous and is defined only when this set is non-empty.

When $\Psi(x) = x^p$, this coincides with the p-th moment of the random variable. Other special cases in the exponential family are taken with respect to the functions $\Psi_q(x) = \exp(x^q)-1$ (for $q \geq 1$). A random variable with finite $\Psi_2$ norm is said to be "sub-Gaussian" and a random variable with finite $\Psi_1$ norm is said to be "sub-exponential". Indeed, the boundedness of the $\Psi_p$ norm characterizes the limiting behavior of the probability distribution function:

$$\|X\|_{\Psi_p} <\infty \iff {\Bbb P}(|X|\ge x)\le Ke^{-K' x^p}\qquad {\rm for\  some\  constants\ } K, K'>0,$$

so that the tail of the probability distribution function is bounded above by $O(e^{-K' x^p})$.

The $\Psi_1$ norm may be easily computed from a strictly monotonic moment-generating function. For example, the moment-generating function of a chi-squared random variable X with K degrees of freedom is $M_X(t) = (1-2t)^{-K/2}$, so that the reciprocal of the $\Psi_1$ norm is related to the functional inverse of the moment-generating function:

$$\|X\|_{\Psi_1} ^{-1} = M_X^{-1}(2) = (1-4^{-1/K})/2.$$
