= Young function =

Mathematical functions

In mathematics, Young functions are a class of functions that arise in functional analysis, especially in the study of Orlicz spaces.

== Definition ==
A function $\theta : \R \to [0, \infty]$ is called a Young function if it is convex, even, lower semicontinuous, and non-trivial, in the sense that it is neither the zero function $x \mapsto 0$ nor its convex dual

$$x \mapsto \begin{cases} \,\,\,0 & \text{ if } x = 0, \\ +\infty & \text{ otherwise.}\end{cases}$$

A Young function said to be finite if it does not take the value $\infty$.

A Young function $\theta$ is strict if both $\theta$ and its convex dual $\theta^*$ are finite; i.e.,

$$\lim_{x\to\infty}\frac{\theta(x)} x = \infty.$$

The inverse of a Young function is given by $\theta^{-1}(y)=\inf \{x: \theta(x)>y\}$.

Some authors (such as Krasnosel'skii and Rutickii) also require that

$$\lim_{x \downarrow 0} \frac{\theta(x)}{x} = 0$$.

=== Norm ===
Let $\mu$ be a σ-finite measure on a set $X$, and $\theta$ a Young function. For any measurable function $f$ on $X$, we define the Luxemburg norm as

$$\|f\|_\theta = \inf\left\{b>0\;\bigg\vert\int_X \theta(|f|/b)\,d\mu\le 1 \right\}.$$

== Examples ==
The following functions are Young functions:

- $\theta_\text{exp}(x) = e^{|x|} - 1$.
- $\theta_p(x) = |s|^p/p$ for all $p\geq 1$. This function leads to the usual norm $p^{1/p}\|f\|_\theta=\|f\|_p = (\textstyle\int_X |f|^p d\mu)^{1/p}$ on $L^p(\mu)$.
