= Subexponential distribution (light-tailed) =

Type of light-tailed probability distribution

In probability theory, in the context of light-tailed distributions, one definition of a subexponential distribution is as a probability distribution whose tails decay at an exponential rate, or faster: a real-valued distribution $\cal D$ is called subexponential if, for a random variable $X\sim {\cal D}$,

${\Bbb P}(|X|\ge x)=O(e^{-K x})$, for large $x$ and some constant $K>0$.

Note that this is almost the opposite of the more established meaning of subexponential in the context of Heavy-tailed distributions, where "sub" means that the rate of decay is slower than exponential, rather than that the tail is lighter than exponential.

The subexponential norm, $\|\cdot\|_{\psi_1}$, of a random variable is defined by

$\|X\|_{\psi_1}:=\inf\ \{ K>0\mid {\Bbb E}(e^{|X|/K})\le 2\},$ where the infimum is taken to be $+\infty$ if no such $K$ exists.

This is an example of a Orlicz norm. An equivalent condition for a distribution $\cal D$ to be subexponential is then that $\|X\|_{\psi_1}<\infty.$

Subexponentiality can also be expressed in the following equivalent ways:

1. ${\Bbb P}(|X|\ge x)\le 2 e^{-K x},$ for all $x\ge 0$ and some constant $K>0$.
2. ${\Bbb E}(|X|^p)^{1/p}\le K p,$ for all $p\ge 1$ and some constant $K>0$.
3. For some constant $K>0$, ${\Bbb E}(e^{\lambda |X|}) \le e^{K\lambda}$ for all $0\le \lambda \le 1/K$.
4. ${\Bbb E}(X)$ exists and for some constant $K>0$, ${\Bbb E}(e^{\lambda (X-{\Bbb E}(X))})\le e^{K^2 \lambda^2}$ for all $-1/K\le \lambda\le 1/K$.
5. $\sqrt{|X|}$ is sub-Gaussian.
