= Eustachy Żyliński =

Polish mathematician (1889–1954)

Eustachy Karol Żyliński
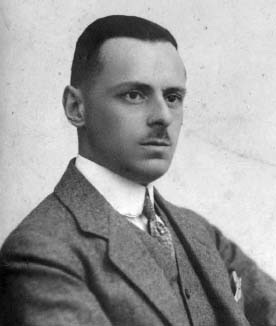
- Żyliński in 1919
- Born: 19 September 1889; Kuna, Podolia Governorate
- Died: 4 July 1954 (aged 64); Łódź, Poland
- Education: University of Lwów
- Awards: Medal for Long Service (1938)
- Scientific career
- Doctoral students: Władysław Orlicz

Eustachy Karol Żyliński (19 September 1889 – 4 July 1954) was a Polish mathematician and university professor known for his work on number theory, algebra, and logic. He was a member of the Lwów School of Mathematics.

== Biography ==
=== Early life and career (1889–1919) ===
Żyliński was born in to a landless noble family. In 1907 he graduated with a gold medal from the gymnasium in Kiev, and in 1911 with a first-degree diploma from the Faculty of Physics and Mathematics of the University of Imperial Saint Vladimir University in Kiev, where he then worked from 1912 to 1914, while doing internships in Göttingen, Cambridge and Marburg. In 1914 he obtained a master's degree (equivalent to today's PhD).

In 1916 he was drafted into the Imperial Russian army. He graduated from a military-engineering school in Kiev and an electrical engineering school in St. Petersburg in 1917 put himself at the disposal of the 1st Polish Corps. From 1918, as an associate professor, he lectured at the Polish University College and the Higher Technical Institute in Kiev. In 1919 he stayed in Warsaw, performing military service as an officer of the Polish Army.

=== Lwów School of Mathematics (1919–1945) ===
From October 1919, he was associate professor at the Jan Kazimierz University in Lwów and in July 1922 Żyliński was appointed full professor at University in Lwów, and then head of the Department of Mathematics A at the Faculty of Philosophy. In 1925, he proved that "there are exactly two binary functors (namely, binegation and the Sheffer stroke) each of which is sufficient for defining all other unary and binary functors of classical propositional logic." His colleagues included mathematicians such as Stefan Banach and Hugo Steinhaus. 1929 he was dean of the Faculty of Mathematics and Natural Sciences of the Jagiellonian University and was the promoter of Władysław Orlicz's doctoral dissertation.

During the Soviet occupation of Lwów he worked as the head of the Algebra Department at the University of Lwów, and during the German occupation (1941–1944) he took part in clandestine teaching at the Jagiellonian University.

=== Postwar career (1945–1954) ===
After Lwów was reoccupied by the Red Army, he started working at the university. From March 15, 1945, Żyliński was a member of the Union of Polish Patriots in Lviv. After the deportation of Poles from Lviv, he initially settled in Łódź. At that time, he worked at the Ministry of Foreign Affairs, and was also nominated as consul general in Kiev, but did not assume this office. In 1947 he moved to Gliwice, where in the years 1946–1951 he was the head of the Department of Mathematics at the Faculty of Engineering and Construction of the Silesian University of Technology. In 1951 he retired and returned to Lodz. Żyliński died there in 1954 of a cerebral hemorrhage.
