= Stanisław Knapowski =

Polish mathematician (1931–1967)

- Knapowski expanded on the distribution of primes
- Born: May 19, 1931; Poznań, Poland
- Died: September 28, 1967 (aged 36); Florida, USA
- Citizenship: Polish
- Education: Poznań University, Wrocław University and Adam Mickiewicz University
- Known for: Prime numbers and number theory
- Awards: Mazurkiewicz Prize, Rockefeller Scholarship
- Scientific career
- Fields: Mathematician

Stanisław Knapowski (May 19, 1931 – September 28, 1967) was a Polish mathematician who worked on prime numbers and number theory. Knapowski published 53 papers despite dying at the age of only 36.

== Life and education ==
Stanisław Knapowski was the son of Zofia Krysiewicz and Roch Knapowski. His father, Roch Knapowski was a lawyer in Poznań but later taught at Poznań University. The family moved to the Kielce province in south-eastern Poland after the German invasion of 1939 but returned to Poznań after the war.

Stanisław completed his high school education in 1949 excelling at math and continued on at Poznań University to study mathematics. Later in 1952 he continued his studies at University of Wrocław and earned his master's degree in 1954.

Knapowski was appointment an assistant at Adam Mickiewicz University in Poznań under Władysław Orlicz and worked towards his doctorate. He studied under the direction of Pál Turán starting in Lublin in 1956. He published many of his papers with Turán and Turán wrote a short biography of his life and work in 1971 after his death. Knapowski began to work in this area and finished his doctorate in 1957 “Zastosowanie metod Turaná w analitycznej teorii liczb” ("Certain applications of Turan's methods in the analytical theory of numbers").

Knapowski spent a year in Cambridge where he worked with Louis J. Mordell and listened to classes by J.W.S. Cassels and Albert Ingham. He visited Belgium, France and The Netherlands.

Knapowski returned to Poznań to finish another thesis to complete a post-doctoral qualification needed to lecture at a German university. "On new "explicit formulas" in prime number theory" in 1960. In 1962 the Polish Mathematical Society awarded him their Mazurkiewicz Prize and he moved to Tulane University in New Orleans, United States. After a very short return to Poland, he left again and taught in Marburg in Germany, Gainesville, Florida and Miami, Florida.

== Personal life; and death ==
Knapowski was a good classical pianist. He was an avid driver. He died in a traffic accident where he lost control of his car while leaving the Miami airport.

== Work ==
Knapowski expanded on the work of others in several fields of number theory, prime number theorem, modular arithmetic and non-Euclidean geometry.

=== Number of times the Δ(n) prime sign changes ===
The relative error of $\tfrac{n}{\log n}$ and the logarithmic integral $\operatorname{Li}(n)$ as approximations to the prime-counting function. Both relative errors decrease to zero as $n$ grows, but the convergence to zero is much more rapid for the logarithmic integral.

Mathematicians work on primality tests to develop easier ways to find prime numbers when finding them by trial division is not practical. This has many applications in cybersecurity. There is no formula to calculate prime numbers. However, the distribution of primes can be statistically modelled. The prime number theorem, which was proven at the end of the 19th century, says that the probability of a randomly chosen number being prime is inversely proportional to its number of digits (logarithm). At the start of the 19th century, Adrien-Marie Legendre and Carl Friedrich Gauss suggested that as $x$ becomes large, the number of primes up to $x$ asymptotically approaches $x/\log x$, where $\log x$ is the natural logarithm of $x$.

$$\operatorname{li}(n) = \int_0^n \frac{dt}{\log t}$$

where the integral is evaluated at $t = n$, also fits the distribution.

The prime-counting function $\pi(n)$ is defined as the number of primes not greater than $n$.

And $\Delta(n)=\pi(n)-\operatorname{li}(n)$

Bernhard Riemann stated that $\Delta(n)$ was always negative but J.E. Littlewood later disproved this. In 1914 J.E. Littlewood proved that there are arbitrarily large values of x for which

$$\pi(x)>\operatorname{Li}(x) +\frac13\frac{\sqrt x}{\log x}\log\log\log x,$$

and that there are also arbitrarily large values of x for which

$$\pi(x)<\operatorname{Li}(x) -\frac13\frac{\sqrt x}{\log x}\log\log\log x.$$

Thus the difference π(x) − Li(x) changes sign infinitely many times.

Stanley Skewes then added an upper bound on the smallest natural number $x$:

$$\pi(x) > \operatorname{li}(x),$$

Knapowski followed this up and published a paper on the number of times $\Delta(n)$ changes sign in the interval $\Delta(n)$.

=== Modular arithmetic ===
Knapowski worked in other areas of number theory. One area was on the distribution of prime numbers in different residue classes modulo $k$.

Modular arithmetic modifies usual arithmetic by only using the numbers $\{0,1,2,\dots,n-1\}$, for a natural number $n$ called the modulus. Any other natural number can be mapped into this system by replacing it by its remainder after division by $n$.

The distribution of the primes looks random, without a pattern. Take a list of consecutive prime numbers and divide them by another prime (like 7) and keep only the remainder (this is called reducing them modulo 7). The result is a sequence of integers from 1 to 6. Knapowski worked to determine the parameters of this modular distribution

=== Other areas of research ===
- Non-Euclidean geometry
- On prime numbers in arithmetical progression
- Möbius function
- On a theorem of Hecke
- On Linnik's theorem concerning exceptional L-zeros” (1961)
- Comparative prime number theory
- On Siegel's Theorem
