= Alexiewicz norm =

Integral norm associated to the Henstock–Kurzweil integral

In mathematics — specifically, in integration theory — the Alexiewicz norm is an integral norm associated to the Henstock–Kurzweil integral. The Alexiewicz norm turns the space of Henstock–Kurzweil integrable functions into a topological vector space that is barrelled but not complete. The Alexiewicz norm is named after the Polish mathematician Andrzej Alexiewicz, who introduced it in 1948.

== Definition ==
Let HK(R) denote the space of all functions f: R → R that have finite Henstock–Kurzweil integral. Define the Alexiewicz semi-norm of f ∈ HK(R) by

$$\| f \| := \sup \left\{ \left| \int_{I} f \right| : I \subseteq \mathbb{R} \text{ is an interval} \right\}.$$

This defines a semi-norm on HK(R); if functions that are equal Lebesgue-almost everywhere are identified, then this procedure defines a bona fide norm on the quotient of HK(R) by the equivalence relation of equality almost everywhere. (Note that the only constant function f: R → R that is integrable is the one with constant value zero.)

== Properties ==
- The Alexiewicz norm endows HK(R) with a topology that is barrelled but incomplete.
- The Alexiewicz norm as defined above is equivalent to the norm defined by

$$\| f \|' := \sup_{x \in \mathbb{R}} \left| \int_{- \infty}^{x} f \right|.$$

- The completion of HK(R) with respect to the Alexiewicz norm is often denoted A(R) and is a subspace of the space of tempered distributions, the dual of Schwartz space. More precisely, A(R) consists of those tempered distributions that are distributional derivatives of functions in the collection

$$\left\{ F \colon \mathbb{R} \to \mathbb{R} \,\left|\, F \text{ is continuous, } \lim_{x \to - \infty} F(x) = 0, \lim_{x \to + \infty} F(x) \in \mathbb{R} \right. \right\}.$$

Therefore, if f ∈ A(R), then f is a tempered distribution and there exists a continuous function F in the above collection such that

$$\langle F', \varphi \rangle = - \langle F, \varphi' \rangle = - \int_{- \infty}^{+ \infty} F \varphi' = \langle f, \varphi \rangle$$

for every compactly supported C^{∞} test function φ: R → R. In this case, it holds that

$$\| f \|' = \sup_{x \in \mathbb{R}} |F(x)| = \| F \|_{\infty}.$$

- The translation operator is continuous with respect to the Alexiewicz norm. That is, if for f ∈ HK(R) and x ∈ R the translation T_{x}f of f by x is defined by

$$(T_{x} f)(y) := f(y - x),$$

then

$$\| T_{x} f - f \| \to 0 \text{ as } x \to 0.$$
