= Sub-Gaussian distribution =

Type of probability distribution

In probability theory, a subgaussian distribution, the distribution of a subgaussian random variable, is a probability distribution with strong tail decay. More specifically, the tails of a subgaussian distribution are dominated by (i.e. decay at least as fast as) the tails of a Gaussian. This property gives subgaussian distributions their name.

Often in analysis, we divide an object (such as a random variable) into two parts, a central bulk and a distant tail, then analyze each separately. In probability, this division usually goes like "Everything interesting happens near the center. The tail event is so rare, we may safely ignore that." Subgaussian distributions are worthy of study, because the gaussian distribution is well-understood, and so we can give sharp bounds on the rarity of the tail event. An analogous class, sometimes called subexponential distributions, is also useful; note however that the more established meaning of subexponential is almost the opposite—that decay is slower than exponential rather than that the tail is lighter than exponential—and so care must be taken with that term.

Formally, the probability distribution of a random variable $X$ is called subgaussian if there is a positive constant C such that for every $t \geq 0$,

$$\mathbb{P}(|X| \geq t) \leq 2 \exp{(-t^2/C^2)}$$.

There are many equivalent definitions. For example, a random variable $X$ is sub-Gaussian iff its distribution function is bounded from above (up to a constant) by the distribution function of a Gaussian:

$$\mathbb{P}(|X| \geq t) \leq c\, \mathbb{P}(|Z| \geq t) \quad \forall t > 0$$

where $c\ge 0$ is constant and $Z$ is a mean zero Gaussian random variable.

== Definitions ==
=== Subgaussian norm ===
The subgaussian norm of $X$, denoted as $\Vert X \Vert_{\psi_2}$, is
$$\Vert X \Vert_{\psi_2} = \inf\left\{ c>0 : \mathbb{E}\left[\exp{\left(\frac{X^2}{c^2}\right)}\right] \leq 2 \right\}.$$
In other words, it is the Orlicz norm of $X$ generated by the Orlicz function $\Phi(u)=e^{u^2}-1.$ By condition $(2)$ below, subgaussian random variables can be characterized as those random variables with finite subgaussian norm.

=== Variance proxy ===
If there exists a number $s^2 \ge 0$ such that $\mathbb{E} [e^{(X-\mathbb{E}[X])t}] \leq e^{\frac{s^2t^2}{2}}$ for all $t \in \mathbb{R}$, then $s^2$ is called a variance proxy. The smallest such $s^2$ is called the optimal variance proxy and denoted by $\Vert X\Vert_{\mathrm{vp}}^2$.

The optimal variance proxy and the subgaussian norm are related by
$$\sqrt{3/8} \cdot \Vert X \Vert_{\psi_2} \leq \Vert X\Vert_{\mathrm{vp}} \leq \sqrt{\log 2} \cdot \Vert X \Vert_{\psi_2},$$
and both bounds are sharp, attained by the standard Gaussian and Rademacher distributions, respectively.

For a Gaussian random variable $X \sim \mathcal{N}(\mu,\sigma^2)$, one has $\mathbb{E}[e^{(X-\mathbb{E}[X])t}] = e^{\frac{\sigma^2 t^2}{2}}$, and therefore $\|X\|_{\mathrm{vp}}^2 = \sigma^2$.

=== Equivalent definitions ===
Let $X$ be a random variable with zero mean. Let $K_1, K_2, K_3, \dots$ be positive constants. The following conditions are equivalent: (Proposition 2.5.2)

1. Tail probability bound: $\mathbb{P}(|X| \geq t) \leq 2 \exp{(-t^2/K_1^2)}$ for all $t \geq 0$;
2. Finite subgaussian norm: $\Vert X \Vert_{\psi_2} = K_2 < \infty$;
3. Moment: $\mathbb{E} |X|^p \leq 2K_3^p \Gamma\left(\frac{p}{2}+1\right)$ for all $p \geq 1$, where $\Gamma$ is the Gamma function;
4. Moment: $\mathbb{E}|X|^p\leq K^p p^{p/2}$ for all $p \geq 1$;
5. Moment-generating function (of $X$), or variance proxy : $\mathbb{E} [e^{(X-\mathbb{E}[X])t}] \leq e^{\frac{K^2t^2}{2}}$ for all $t$;
6. Moment-generating function (of $X^2$): $\mathbb{E}[e^{X^2t^2}] \leq e^{K^2t^2}$ for all $t \in [-1/K, +1/K]$;
7. Union bound: for some c > 0, $\ \mathbb{E}[\max\{|X_1 - \mathbb{E}[X]|,\ldots,|X_n - \mathbb{E}[X]|\}] \leq c \sqrt{\log n}$ for all n > c, where $X_1, \ldots, X_n$ are i.i.d copies of X;
8. Subexponential: $X^2$ has a subexponential distribution.

Furthermore, the constant $K$ is the same in the definitions (1) to (5), up to an absolute constant. So for example, given a random variable satisfying (1) and (2), the minimal constants $K_1, K_2$ in the two definitions satisfy $K_1 \leq cK_2, K_2 \leq c' K_1$, where $c, c'$ are constants independent of the random variable.

=== Proof of equivalence ===
As an example, the first four definitions are equivalent by the proof below.

Proof. $(1)\implies(3)$ By the layer cake representation,
$$\begin{align}
\mathbb{E} |X|^p &= \int_0^\infty \mathbb{P}(|X|^p \geq t) dt\\
&= \int_0^\infty pt^{p-1}\mathbb{P}(|X| \geq t) dt\\
&\leq 2\int_0^\infty pt^{p-1}\exp\left(-\frac{t^2}{K_1^2}\right) dt\\
\end{align}$$

After a change of variables $u=t^2/K_1^2$, we find that
$$\begin{align}
\mathbb{E} |X|^p &\leq 2K_1^p \frac{p}{2}\int_0^\infty u^{\frac{p}{2}-1}e^{-u} du\\
&= 2K_1^p \frac{p}{2}\Gamma\left(\frac{p}{2}\right)\\
&= 2K_1^p \Gamma\left(\frac{p}{2}+1\right).
\end{align}$$
$(3)\implies(2)$ By the Taylor series $e^x = 1 + \sum_{p=1}^\infty \frac{x^p}{p!},$
$$\begin{align}
\mathbb{E}[\exp{(\lambda X^2)}] &= 1 + \sum_{p=1}^\infty \frac{\lambda^p \mathbb{E}{[X^{2p}]}}{p!}\\
&\leq 1 + \sum_{p=1}^\infty \frac{2\lambda^p K_3^{2p} \Gamma\left(p+1\right)}{p!}\\
&= 1 + 2 \sum_{p=1}^\infty \lambda^p K_3^{2p}\\
&= 2 \sum_{p=0}^\infty \lambda^p K_3^{2p}-1\\
&= \frac{2}{1-\lambda K_3^2}-1 \quad\text{for }\lambda K_3^2 <1,
\end{align}$$
which is less than or equal to $2$ for $\lambda \leq \frac{1}{3K_3^2}$. Let $K_2 \geq 3^{\frac{1}{2}}K_3$, then $\mathbb{E}[\exp{(X^2/K_2^2)}] \leq 2.$

$(2)\implies(1)$ By Markov's inequality,
$$\mathbb{P}(|X|\geq t) = \mathbb{P}\left( \exp\left(\frac{X^2}{K_2^2}\right) \geq \exp\left(\frac{t^2}{K_2^2}\right) \right) \leq \frac{\mathbb{E}[\exp{(X^2/K_2^2)}]}{\exp\left(\frac{t^2}{K_2^2}\right)} \leq 2 \exp\left(-\frac{t^2}{K_2^2}\right).$$
$(3) \iff (4)$ by asymptotic formula for gamma function: $\Gamma(p/2 + 1 ) \sim \sqrt{\pi p} \left(\frac{p}{2e} \right)^{p/2}$.

From the proof, we can extract a cycle of three inequalities:

- If $\mathbb{P}(|X| \geq t) \leq 2 \exp{(-t^2/K^2)}$, then $\mathbb{E} |X|^p \leq 2K^p \Gamma\left(\frac{p}{2}+1\right)$ for all $p \geq 1$.
- If $\mathbb{E} |X|^p \leq 2K^p \Gamma\left(\frac{p}{2}+1\right)$ for all $p \geq 1$, then $\|X \|_{\psi_2} \leq 3^{\frac{1}{2}}K$.
- If $\|X \|_{\psi_2} \leq K$, then $\mathbb{P}(|X| \geq t) \leq 2 \exp{(-t^2/K^2)}$.

In particular, the constant $K$ provided by the definitions are the same up to a constant factor, so we can say that the definitions are equivalent up to a constant independent of $X$.

Similarly, because up to a positive multiplicative constant, $\Gamma(p/2 + 1) = p^{p/2} \times ((2e)^{-1/2}p^{1/2p})^p$ for all $p \geq 1$, the definitions (3) and (4) are also equivalent up to a constant.

== Basic properties ==
Basic properties—* If $X$ is subgaussian, and $k > 0$, then $\|kX\|_{\psi_2} = k \|X\|_{\psi_2}$ and $\|kX\|_{vp} = k \|X\|_{vp}$.

- (Triangle inequality) If $X, Y$ are subgaussian, then
  $$\|X+Y\|_{vp}^2 \leq (\|X\|_{vp} + \|Y\|_{vp})^2$$
- (Chernoff bound) If $X$ is subgaussian, then
  $$\mathbb{P}(X \geq t) \leq e^{-\frac{t^2}{2\|X\|_{vp}^2}}$$
  for all $t \geq 0$

$X \lesssim X'$ means that $X \leq CX'$, where the positive constant $C$ is independent of $X$ and $X'$.

Subgaussian deviation bound—If $X$ is subgaussian, then
$$\|X - \mathbb{E}[X]\|_{\psi_2} \lesssim \|X\|_{\psi_2}$$

Proof

By triangle inequality, $\|X - \mathbb{E}[X]\|_{\psi_2} \leq \|X\|_{\psi_2} + \|\mathbb{E}[X]\|_{\psi_2}$. Now we have $\|\mathbb{E}[X]\|_{\psi_2} = \sqrt{\ln 2} |\mathbb{E}[X]| \leq \sqrt{\ln 2} \mathbb{E}[|X|] \sim \mathbb{E}[|X|]$. By the equivalence of definitions (2) and (4) of subgaussianity, we have $\mathbb{E}[|X|] \lesssim \|X\|_{\psi_2}$.

Independent subgaussian sum bound—If $X, Y$ are subgaussian and independent, then
$$\|X+Y\|_{vp}^2 \leq \|X\|_{vp}^2 + \|Y\|_{vp}^2$$

Proof

If independent, then use that the cumulant of independent random variables is additive. That is, $\ln \mathbb{E}[e^{t(X+Y)}] = \ln \mathbb{E}[e^{tX}] + \ln \mathbb{E}[e^{tY}]$.

If not independent, then by Hölder's inequality, for any $1/p + 1/q = 1$ we have
$$\mathbb{E}[e^{t(X+Y)}] = \|e^{t(X+Y)}\|_1 \leq e^{\frac 12 t^2 (p \|X\|_{vp}^2 + q \|Y\|_{vp}^2)}$$
Solving the optimization problem
$$\begin{cases}
\min p \|X\|_{vp}^2 + q \|Y\|_{vp}^2 \\
1/p + 1/q = 1
\end{cases}$$
, we obtain the result.

Corollary—Linear sums of subgaussian random variables are subgaussian.

Partial converse (Matoušek 2008, Lemma 2.4)—If $\mathbb{E}[X] = 0, \mathbb{E}[X^2] =1$, and $-\ln \mathbb{P}(X \geq t) \geq \frac 12 at^2$ for all $t >0$, then
$$\ln \mathbb{E}[e^{tX}] \leq C_at^2$$
where $C_a > 0$ depends on $a$ only.

Proof
Proof

Let $F(x)$ be the CDF of $X$. The proof splits the integral of MGF to two halves, one with $tX > 1$ and one with $tX \leq 1$, and bound each one respectively.

$$\begin{aligned}
\mathbb{E}[e^{tX}]
&= \int_\R e^{tx} dF(x) \\
&= \int_{-\infty}^{1/t} e^{tx} dF(x) + \int_{1/t}^{+\infty} e^{tx} dF(x) \\
\end{aligned}$$
Since $e^x \leq 1+x+x^2$ for $x \leq 1$,
$$\begin{aligned}
\int_{-\infty}^{1/t} e^{tx} dF(x)
&\leq \int_{-\infty}^{1/t} (1+tx + t^2x^2) dF(x)  \\
&\leq \int_{\R} (1+tx + t^2x^2) dF(x)  \\
&= 1 + t\mathbb{E}[X] + t^2 \mathbb{E}[X^2] \\
&= 1 + t^2 \\
&\leq e^{t^2}
\end{aligned}$$
For the second term, upper bound it by a summation:
$$\begin{aligned}
\int_{1/t}^{+\infty} e^{tx} dF(x)
&\leq e^2 \mathbb{P}(X \in [1/t, 2/t]) + e^3 \mathbb{P}(X \in [1/t, 2/t]) + \dots \\
&\leq \sum_{k=1}^\infty e^{k+1} \mathbb{P}(X \geq k/t) \\
&\leq \sum_{k=1}^\infty e^{k(2-\frac 12 ak/t^2)}
\end{aligned}$$
When $t\le \sqrt{a/8}$, for any $k\ge1$, $2k - \frac{a k^2}{2t^2} \le -\frac{ak}{4t^2}$, so

$$\leq \frac{1}{e^{\frac{a}{4t^2}} - 1} \leq \frac 4a t^2$$
When $t> \sqrt{a/8}$, by drawing out the curve of $f(x) = e^{-\frac{a}{2t^2}x^2 + 2x}$, and plotting out the summation, we find that
$$\sum_{k=1}^\infty e^{k(2-\frac 12 ak/t^2)} \leq \int_\R f(x)dx + 2 \max_x f(x) = e^{\frac{2 t^2}{a}}\left(\sqrt{\frac{2 \pi t^2}{a}}+2\right) < 10 \sqrt{t^2/a} e^{\frac{2 t^2}{a}}$$
Now verify that $\ln 10 + \frac 12 \ln(t^2/a) + \frac{2}{a}t^2 < C_a t^2$, where $C_a$ depends on $a$ only.

Corollary (Matoušek 2008, Lemma 2.2)—$X_1, \ldots, X_n$ are independent random variables with the same upper subgaussian tail:
$$-\ln \mathbb{P}(X_i \geq t) \geq \frac 12 at^2$$
for all $t>0$. Also, $\mathbb{E}[X_i] = 0, \mathbb{E}[X_i^2] = 1$, then for any unit vector $v\in \R^n$, the linear sum $\sum_i v_i X_i$ has a subgaussian tail:
$$-\ln \mathbb{P}\left(\sum_i v_i X_i \geq t \right) \geq C_a t^2$$
where $C_a > 0$ depends only on $a$.

== Concentration ==
Gaussian concentration inequality for Lipschitz functions (Tao 2012, Theorem 2.1.12.)—If $f: \R^n \to \R$ is $L$-Lipschitz, and $X \sim \mathcal{N}(0, I)$ is a standard gaussian vector, then $f(X)$ concentrates around its expectation at a rate
$$\mathbb{P}(f(X) - \mathbb{E}[f(X)] \geq t)\leq e^{-\frac{2}{\pi^2}\frac{t^2}{L^2}}$$
and similarly for the other tail.

Proof
Proof

By shifting and scaling, it suffices to prove the case where $L = 1$, and $\mathbb{E}[f(X)] = 0$.

Since every 1-Lipschitz function is uniformly approximable by 1-Lipschitz smooth functions (by convolving with a mollifier), it suffices to prove it for 1-Lipschitz smooth functions.

Now it remains to bound the cumulant generating function.

To exploit the Lipschitzness, we introduce $Y$, an independent copy of $X$, then by Jensen,
$$\mathbb{E}[e^{t(X-Y)}] = \mathbb{E}[e^{tX}]\mathbb{E}[e^{-tY}] \geq \mathbb{E}[e^{tX}]e^{-t\mathbb{E}[Y]} = \mathbb{E}[e^{tX}]$$

By the circular symmetry of gaussian variables, we introduce $X_\theta := Y\cos\theta + X\sin\theta$. This has the benefit that its derivative $X' = -Y\sin\theta + X\cos\theta$ is independent of it.

$$\begin{aligned}e^{t(f(X) - f(Y))}
&=e^{t(f(X_{\pi/2}) - f(X_0))} \\
&= e^{t\int_0^{\pi/2} \nabla f(X_\theta) \cdot X_\theta'd\theta} \\
&= e^{\pi t/2 \int_0^{\pi/2} \nabla f(X_\theta) \cdot X_\theta'\frac{d\theta}{\pi/2}} \\
&\leq \int_0^{\pi/2}  e^{\pi t/2 \nabla f(X_\theta) \cdot X_\theta'}\frac{d\theta}{\pi/2} \\
\end{aligned}$$

Now take its expectation,
$$\mathbb{E}[e^{t(f(X) - f(Y))}] \leq \int_0^{\pi/2} \mathbb{E}[e^{\pi t/2 \nabla f(X_\theta) \cdot X_\theta'}]\frac{d\theta}{\pi/2}$$
The expectation within the integral is over the joint distribution of $X, Y$, but since the joint distribution of $X_\theta, X_\theta'$ is exactly the same, we have

$$= \mathbb{E}_X[\mathbb{E}_Y[e^{\pi t/2 \nabla f(X) \cdot Y}]]$$

Conditional on $X$, the quantity $\nabla f(X) \cdot Y$ is normally distributed, with variance $\leq 1$, so
$$\leq e^{\frac 12 (\pi t/2)^2} = e^{\frac{\pi^2}{8} t^2}$$

Thus, we have
$$\ln \mathbb{E}[e^{tf(X)}] \leq \frac{\pi^2}{8}t^2$$

== Strictly subgaussian ==
Expanding the cumulant generating function:
$$\frac 12 s^2 t^2 \geq \ln \mathbb{E}[e^{tX}] = \frac 12 \mathrm{Var}[X] t^2 + \kappa_3 t^3 + \cdots$$
we find that $\mathrm{Var}[X] \leq \|X\|_{\mathrm{vp}}^2$. At the edge of possibility, we define that a random variable $X$ satisfying $\mathrm{Var}[X]=\|X\|_{\mathrm{vp}}^2$ is called strictly subgaussian.

=== Properties ===
Theorem. Let $X$ be a subgaussian random variable with mean zero. If all zeros of its characteristic function are real, then $X$ is strictly subgaussian.

Corollary. If $X_1, \ldots, X_n$ are independent and strictly subgaussian, then any linear sum of them is strictly subgaussian.

=== Examples ===
By calculating the characteristic functions, we can show that some distributions are strictly subgaussian: symmetric uniform distribution, symmetric Bernoulli distribution.

Since a symmetric uniform distribution is strictly subgaussian, its convolution with itself is strictly subgaussian. That is, the symmetric triangular distribution is strictly subgaussian.

Since the symmetric Bernoulli distribution is strictly subgaussian, any symmetric Binomial distribution is strictly subgaussian.

== Examples ==
	$\|X\|_{\psi_2}$	$\|X\|_{vp}^2$	strictly subgaussian?
gaussian distribution $\mathcal N (0, 1)$	$\sqrt{8/3}$	$1$	Yes
mean-zero Bernoulli distribution $p\delta_q + q \delta_{-p}$	solution to $pe^{(q/t)^2} + qe^{(p/t)^2} = 2$	$\frac{p-q}{2(\log p-\log q)}$	Iff $p=0, 1/2, 1$
symmetric Bernoulli distribution $\frac 12 \delta_{-1} + \frac 12 \delta_{1}$	$\frac{1}{\sqrt{\ln 2}}$	$1$	Yes
uniform distribution $U(0, 1)$	solution to $\int_0^1 e^{x^2/t^2}dx = 2$, approximately 0.7727	$1/3$	Yes
arbitrary distribution on interval $[a, b]$		$\leq \left(\frac{b-a}{2}\right)^2$	

The optimal variance proxy $\Vert X\Vert_{\mathrm{vp}}^2$ is known for many standard probability distributions, including the beta, Bernoulli, Dirichlet, Kumaraswamy, triangular, truncated Gaussian, and truncated exponential.

=== Bernoulli distribution ===
Let $p + q = 1$ be two positive numbers. Let $X$ be a centered Bernoulli distribution $p\delta_q + q \delta_{-p}$, so that it has mean zero, then $\Vert X\Vert_{\mathrm{vp}}^2 = \frac{p-q}{2(\log p-\log q)}$. Its subgaussian norm is $t$ where $t$ is the unique positive solution to $pe^{(q/t)^2} + qe^{(p/t)^2} = 2$.

Let $X$ be a random variable with symmetric Bernoulli distribution (or Rademacher distribution). That is, $X$ takes values $-1$ and $1$ with probabilities $1/2$ each. Since $X^2=1$, it follows that
$$\Vert X \Vert_{\psi_2} = \inf\left\{ c>0 : \mathbb{E}\left[\exp{\left(\frac{X^2}{c^2}\right)}\right] \leq 2 \right\} = \inf\left\{ c>0 : \exp{\left(\frac{1}{c^2}\right)} \leq 2 \right\}=\frac{1}{\sqrt{\ln 2}},$$
and hence $X$ is a subgaussian random variable.

=== Bounded distributions ===
Some commonly used bounded distributions.

Bounded distributions have no tail at all, so clearly they are subgaussian.

If $X$ is bounded within the interval $[a, b]$, Hoeffding's lemma states that $\Vert X\Vert_{\mathrm{vp}}^2 \leq \left(\frac{b-a}{2}\right)^2$. Hoeffding's inequality is the Chernoff bound obtained using this fact.

=== Convolutions ===
Density of a mixture of three normal distributions (μ = 5, 10, 15, σ = 2) with equal weights. Each component is shown as a weighted density (each integrating to 1/3)

Since the sum of subgaussian random variables is still subgaussian, the convolution of subgaussian distributions is still subgaussian. In particular, any convolution of the normal distribution with any bounded distribution is subgaussian.

=== Mixtures ===
Given subgaussian distributions $X_1, X_2, \dots, X_n$, we can construct an additive mixture $X$ as follows: first randomly pick a number $i \in \{1, 2, \dots, n\}$, then pick $X_i$.

Since $\mathbb{E}\left[\exp{\left(\frac{X^2}{c^2}\right)}\right] = \sum_i p_i \mathbb{E}\left[\exp{\left(\frac{X_i^2}{c^2}\right)}\right]$we have $\|X\|_{\psi_2} \leq \max_i \|X_i\|_{\psi_2}$, and so the mixture is subgaussian.

In particular, any gaussian mixture is subgaussian.

More generally, the mixture of infinitely many subgaussian distributions is also subgaussian, if the subgaussian norm has a finite supremum: $\|X\|_{\psi_2} \leq \sup_i \|X_i\|_{\psi_2}$.

== Subgaussian random vectors ==
So far, we have discussed subgaussianity for real-valued random variables. We can also define subgaussianity for random vectors. The purpose of subgaussianity is to make the tails decay fast, so we generalize accordingly: a subgaussian random vector is a random vector where the tail decays fast.

Let $X$ be a random vector taking values in $\R^n$.

Define.

- $\|X\|_{\psi_2} := \sup_{v \in S^{n-1}}\|v^T X\|_{\psi_2}$, where $S^{n-1}$ is the unit sphere in $\R^n$. Similarly for the variance proxy $\|X\|_{vp} := \sup_{v \in S^{n-1}}\|v^T X\|_{vp}$
- $X$ is subgaussian iff $\|X\|_{\psi_2} < \infty$.

Theorem. (Theorem 3.4.6) For any positive integer $n$, the uniformly distributed random vector $X \sim U(\sqrt{n} S^{n-1})$ is subgaussian, with $\|X\|_{\psi_2} \lesssim{} 1$.

This is not so surprising, because as $n \to \infty$, the projection of $U(\sqrt{n} S^{n-1})$ to the first coordinate converges in distribution to the standard normal distribution.

== Maximum inequalities ==
Theorem—If $X_1, \ldots, X_n$ are mean-zero subgaussians, with $\|X_i \|_{vp}^2 \leq \sigma^2$, then for any $\delta > 0$, we have $\max(X_1, \dots, X_n) \leq \sigma\sqrt{2 \ln \frac{n}{\delta}}$ with probability $\geq 1-\delta$.

Proof

By the Chernoff bound, $\mathbb{P}(X_i \geq \sigma \sqrt{2 \ln(n/\delta)}) \leq \delta/n$. Now apply the union bound.

Theorem (Exercise 2.5.10)—If $X_1, X_2, \dots$ are subgaussians, with $\|X_i \|_{\psi_2} \leq K$, then
$$\mathbb{E}\left[\sup_n \frac{|X_n|}{\sqrt{1+\ln n}}\right] \lesssim K, \quad \mathbb{E}\left[\max_{1 \leq n \leq N} |X_n|\right] \lesssim K \sqrt{\ln N}$$
Further, the bound is sharp, since when $X_1, X_2, \dots$ are IID samples of $\mathcal N(0, 1)$ we have $\mathbb{E}\left[\max_{1 \leq n \leq N} |X_n|\right] \gtrsim \sqrt{\ln N}$.

Theorem (over a finite set)—If $X_1, \dots, X_n$ are subgaussian, with $\|X_i \|_{vp}^2 \leq \sigma^2$, then
$$\begin{aligned}
\mathbb{E}[\max_i (X_i - \mathbb{E}[X_i])] \leq \sigma\sqrt{ 2\ln n}, &\quad \mathbb{P}(\max_i (X_i- \mathbb{E}[X_i]) > t) \leq n e^{-\frac{t^2}{2\sigma^2}}, \\
\mathbb{E}[\max_i |X_i - \mathbb{E}[X_i]|] \leq \sigma\sqrt{ 2\ln (2n)},
&\quad
\mathbb{P}(\max_i |X_i- \mathbb{E}[X_i]| > t) \leq 2 n e^{-\frac{t^2}{2\sigma^2}}
\end{aligned}$$

Proof

For any t>0:
$$\begin{aligned}
\mathbb{E}\!\bigl[\max_{1\le i\le n}(X_i-\mathbb{E}[X_i])\bigr]
&=\frac1t\,\mathbb{E}\!\Bigl[\ln\max_{i}e^{\,t(X_i-\mathbb{E}[X_i])}\Bigr]\\
&\le\frac1t\ln \mathbb{E}\!\Bigl[\max_{i}e^{\,t(X_i-\mathbb{E}[X_i])}\Bigr] \quad \text{by Jensen}\\
&\le\frac1t\ln\sum_{i=1}^{n}\mathbb{E} e^{t(X_i-\mathbb{E}[X_i])}\\
&\le\frac1t\ln\sum_{i=1}^{n}e^{\sigma^{2}t^{2}/2}\quad \text{by def of }\|\cdot\|_{vp}\\
&=\frac{\ln n}{t}+\frac{\sigma^{2}t}{2} \\
&\overset{t=\sqrt{2\ln n}/\sigma}{=}\;\sigma\sqrt{2\ln n},
\end{aligned}$$
This is a standard proof structure for proving Chernoff-like bounds for sub-Gaussian variables. For the second equation, it suffices to prove the case with one variable and zero mean, then use the union bound. First by Markov, $\mathbb{P}(X > t) \leq \mathbb{P}(e^{sX} > e^{st}) \leq e^{-st} \mathbb{E}[e^{sX}]$, then by definition of variance proxy, $\leq e^{-st} e^{\sigma^2s^2/2}$, and then optimize at $s = -t^2/2\sigma^2$.

Corollary (over a convex polytope)—Fix a finite set of vectors $v_1, \dots, v_n$. If $X$ is a random vector, such that each $\| v_i^T X \|_{vp}^2 \leq \sigma^2$, then the above 4 inequalities hold, with $\max_{v \in \mathrm{conv}(v_1, \dots, v_n)}(v^T X - \mathbb{E}[v^T X])$ replacing $\max_i (X_i - \mathbb{E}[X_i])$. Here, $\mathrm{conv}(v_1, \dots, v_n)$ is the convex polytope hulled by the vectors $v_1, \dots, v_n$.

Theorem (subgaussian random vectors)—If $X$ is a random vector in $\R^d$, such that $\|v^T X\|_{vp}^2 \leq \sigma^2$ for all $v$ on the unit sphere $S$, then
$$\mathbb{E}[\max_{v \in S} v^T X] = \mathbb{E}[\max_{v \in S} |v^T X|] \leq 4\sigma \sqrt{d}$$
For any $\delta > 0$, with probability at least $1-\delta$,
$$\max_{v \in S} v^T X = \max_{v \in S} | v^T X | \leq 4 \sigma \sqrt{d}+2 \sigma \sqrt{2 \log (1 / \delta)}$$

== Inequalities ==
Theorem. (Theorem 2.6.1) There exists a positive constant $C$ such that given any number of independent mean-zero subgaussian random variables $X_1, \dots,X_n$,
$$\left\|\sum_{i=1}^n X_i\right\|_{\psi_2}^2 \leq C \sum_{i=1}^n\left\|X_i\right\|_{\psi_2}^2$$
Theorem. (Hoeffding's inequality) (Theorem 2.6.3) There exists a positive constant $c$ such that given any number of independent mean-zero subgaussian random variables $X_1, \dots,X_N$,
$$\mathbb{P}\left(\left|\sum_{i=1}^N X_i\right| \geq t\right) \leq 2 \exp \left(-\frac{c t^2}{\sum_{i=1}^N\left\|X_i\right\|_{\psi_2}^2}\right)
\quad \forall t > 0$$
Theorem. (Bernstein's inequality) (Theorem 2.8.1) There exists a positive constant $c$ such that given any number of independent mean-zero subexponential random variables $X_1, \dots,X_N$,
$$\mathbb{P}\left(\left|\sum_{i=1}^N X_i\right| \geq t\right) \leq 2 \exp \left(-c \min \left(\frac{t^2}{\sum_{i=1}^N\left\|X_i\right\|_{\psi_1}^2}, \frac{t}{\max _i\left\|X_i\right\|_{\psi_1}}\right)\right)$$
Theorem. (Khinchine inequality) (Exercise 2.6.5) There exists a positive constant $C$ such that given any number of independent mean-zero variance-one subgaussian random variables $X_1, \dots,X_N$, any $p \geq 2$, and any $a_1, \dots, a_N \in \R$,
$$\left(\sum_{i=1}^N a_i^2\right)^{1 / 2} \leq\left\|\sum_{i=1}^N a_i X_i\right\|_{L^p} \leq C K \sqrt{p}\left(\sum_{i=1}^N a_i^2\right)^{1 / 2}$$

== Hanson-Wright inequality ==
The Hanson-Wright inequality states that if a random vector $X$ is subgaussian in a certain sense, then any quadratic form $A$ of this vector, $X^TAX$, is also subgaussian/subexponential. Further, the upper bound on the tail of $X^TAX$, is uniform.

A weak version of the following theorem was proved in (Hanson, Wright, 1971). There are many extensions and variants. Much like the central limit theorem, the Hanson-Wright inequality is more a cluster of theorems with the same purpose, than a single theorem. The purpose is to take a subgaussian vector and uniformly bound its quadratic forms.

Theorem. There exists a constant $c$, such that:

Let $n$ be a positive integer. Let $X_1, ..., X_n$ be independent random variables, such that each satisfies $E[X_i] = 0$. Combine them into a random vector $X = (X_1, \dots, X_n)$. For any $n\times n$ matrix $A$, we have
$$\mathbb{P}(|X^T AX - \mathbb{E}[X^TAX]| > t ) \leq \max\left( 2 e^{-\frac{ct^2}{K^4\|A\|_F^2}}, 2 e^{-\frac{ct}{K^2\|A\|}} \right) =
2 \exp \left[-c \min \left(\frac{t^2}{K^4\|A\|_F^2}, \frac{t}{K^2\|A\|}\right)\right]$$
where $K = \max_i \|X_i\|_{\psi_2}$, and $\|A\|_F = \sqrt{\sum_{ij} A_{ij}^2}$ is the Frobenius norm of the matrix, and $\|A\| = \max_{\|x\|_2=1} \|Ax\|_2$ is the operator norm of the matrix.

In words, the quadratic form $X^TAX$ has its tail uniformly bounded by an exponential, or a gaussian, whichever is larger.

In the statement of the theorem, the constant $c$ is an "absolute constant", meaning that it has no dependence on $n, X_1, \dots, X_n, A$. It is a mathematical constant much like pi and e.

=== Consequences ===
Theorem (subgaussian concentration). There exists a constant $c$, such that:

Let $n, m$ be positive integers. Let $X_1, ..., X_n$ be independent random variables, such that each satisfies $\mathbb{E}[X_i] = 0, \mathbb{E}[X_i^2] = 1$. Combine them into a random vector $X = (X_1, \dots, X_n)$. For any $m\times n$ matrix $A$, we have
$$\mathbb{P}( | \| AX\|_2 - \|A\|_F | > t ) \leq  2 e^{-\frac{ct^2}{K^4\|A\|^2}}$$
In words, the random vector $A X$ is concentrated on a spherical shell of radius $\|A \|_F$, such that $\| AX\|_2 - \|A \|_F$ is subgaussian, with subgaussian norm $\leq \sqrt{3/c} \|A\| K^2$.

== See also ==
- Platykurtic distribution
