= Orlicz sequence space =

In mathematics, an Orlicz sequence space is any of certain class of linear spaces of scalar-valued sequences, endowed with a special norm, specified below, under which it forms a Banach space. Orlicz sequence spaces generalize the $\ell_p$ spaces, and as such play an important role in functional analysis. Orlicz sequence spaces are particular examples of Orlicz spaces.

== Definition ==
Fix $\mathbb{K}\in\{\mathbb{R},\mathbb{C}\}$ so that $\mathbb{K}$ denotes either the real or complex scalar field. We say that a function $M:[0,\infty)\to[0,\infty)$ is an Orlicz function if it is continuous, nondecreasing, and (perhaps nonstrictly) convex, with $M(0)=0$ and $\lim_{t\to\infty}M(t)=\infty$. In the special case where there exists $b>0$ with $M(t)=0$ for all $t\in[0,b]$ it is called degenerate.

In what follows, unless otherwise stated we'll assume all Orlicz functions are nondegenerate. This implies $M(t)>0$ for all $t>0$.

For each scalar sequence $(a_n)_{n=1}^\infty\in\mathbb{K}^\mathbb{N}$ set

$$\left\|(a_n)_{n=1}^\infty\right\|_M=\inf\left\{\rho>0:\sum_{n=1}^\infty M(|a_n|/\rho)\leqslant 1\right\}.$$

We then define the Orlicz sequence space with respect to $M$, denoted $\ell_M$, as the linear space of all $(a_n)_{n=1}^\infty\in\mathbb{K}^\mathbb{N}$ such that $\sum_{n=1}^\infty M(|a_n|/\rho)<\infty$ for some $\rho>0$, endowed with the norm $\|\cdot\|_M$.

Two other definitions will be important in the ensuing discussion. An Orlicz function $M$ is said to satisfy the Δ_{2} condition at zero whenever

$$\limsup_{t\to 0}\frac{M(2t)}{M(t)}<\infty.$$

We denote by $h_M$ the subspace of scalar sequences $(a_n)_{n=1}^\infty\in\ell_M$ such that $\sum_{n=1}^\infty M(|a_n|/\rho)<\infty$ for all $\rho>0$.

== Properties ==
The space $\ell_M$ is a Banach space, and it generalizes the classical $\ell_p$ spaces in the following precise sense: when $M(t)=t^p$, $1\leqslant p<\infty$, then $\|\cdot\|_M$ coincides with the $\ell_p$-norm, and hence $\ell_M=\ell_p$; if $M$ is the degenerate Orlicz function then $\|\cdot\|_M$ coincides with the $\ell_\infty$-norm, and hence $\ell_M=\ell_\infty$ in this special case, and $h_M=c_0$ when $M$ is degenerate.

In general, the unit vectors may not form a basis for $\ell_M$, and hence the following result is of considerable importance.

Theorem 1. If $M$ is an Orlicz function then the following conditions are equivalent:

1. $M$ satisfies the Δ_{2} condition at zero, i.e. $\limsup_{t\to 0}M(2t)/M(t)<\infty$.
2. For every $\lambda>0$ there exists positive constants $K=K(\lambda)$ and $b=b(\lambda)$ so that $M(\lambda t)\leqslant KM(t)$ for all $t\in[0,b]$.
3. $\limsup_{t\to 0}tM'(t)/M(t)<\infty$ (where $M'$ is a nondecreasing function defined everywhere except perhaps on a countable set, where instead we can take the right-hand derivative which is defined everywhere).
4. $\ell_M=h_M$.
5. The unit vectors form a boundedly complete symmetric basis for $\ell_M$.
6. $\ell_M$ is separable.
7. $\ell_M$ fails to contain any subspace isomorphic to $\ell_\infty$.
8. $(a_n)_{n=1}^\infty\in\ell_M$ if and only if $\sum_{n=1}^\infty M(|a_n|)<\infty$.

Two Orlicz functions $M$ and $N$ satisfying the Δ_{2} condition at zero are called equivalent whenever there exist are positive constants $A,B,b>0$ such that $AN(t)\leqslant M(t)\leqslant BN(t)$ for all $t\in[0,b]$. This is the case if and only if the unit vector bases of $\ell_M$ and $\ell_N$ are equivalent.

$\ell_M$ can be isomorphic to $\ell_N$ without their unit vector bases being equivalent. (See the example below of an Orlicz sequence space with two nonequivalent symmetric bases.)

Theorem 2. Let $M$ be an Orlicz function. Then $\ell_M$ is reflexive if and only if

$\liminf_{t\to 0}\frac{tM'(t)}{M(t)}>1\;\;$ and $\;\;\limsup_{t\to 0}\frac{tM'(t)}{M(t)}<\infty$.

Theorem 3 (K. J. Lindberg). Let $X$ be an infinite-dimensional closed subspace of a separable Orlicz sequence space $\ell_M$. Then $X$ has a subspace $Y$ isomorphic to some Orlicz sequence space $\ell_N$ for some Orlicz function $N$ satisfying the Δ_{2} condition at zero. If furthermore $X$ has an unconditional basis then $Y$ may be chosen to be complemented in $X$, and if $X$ has a symmetric basis then $X$ itself is isomorphic to $\ell_N$.

Theorem 4 (Lindenstrauss/Tzafriri). Every separable Orlicz sequence space $\ell_M$ contains a subspace isomorphic to $\ell_p$ for some $1\leqslant p<\infty$.

Corollary. Every infinite-dimensional closed subspace of a separable Orlicz sequence space contains a further subspace isomorphic to $\ell_p$ for some $1\leqslant p<\infty$.

Note that in the above Theorem 4, the copy of $\ell_p$ may not always be chosen to be complemented, as the following example shows.

Example (Lindenstrauss/Tzafriri). There exists a separable and reflexive Orlicz sequence space $\ell_M$ which fails to contain a complemented copy of $\ell_p$ for any $1\leqslant p\leqslant\infty$. This same space $\ell_M$ contains at least two nonequivalent symmetric bases.

Theorem 5 (K. J. Lindberg & Lindenstrauss/Tzafriri). If $\ell_M$ is an Orlicz sequence space satisfying $\liminf_{t\to 0}tM'(t)/M(t)=\limsup_{t\to 0}tM'(t)/M(t)$ (i.e., the two-sided limit exists) then the following are all true.

1. $\ell_M$ is separable.
2. $\ell_M$ contains a complemented copy of $\ell_p$ for some $1\leqslant p<\infty$.
3. $\ell_M$ has a unique symmetric basis (up to equivalence).

Example. For each $1\leqslant p<\infty$, the Orlicz function $M(t)=t^p/(1-\log (t))$ satisfies the conditions of Theorem 5 above, but is not equivalent to $t^p$.
