= Andrzej Alexiewicz =

Polish mathematician (1917–1995)

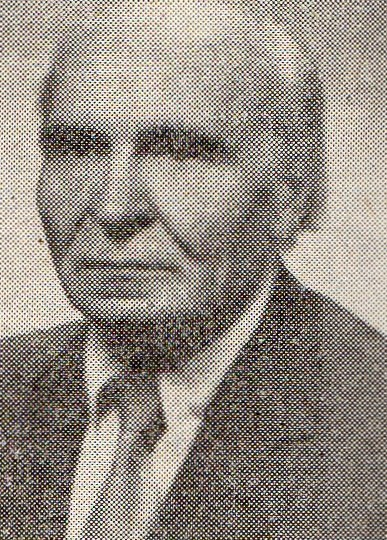
Portrait from Kronika Miasta Poznania, 1988

Andrzej Alexiewicz (11 February 1917, Lwów, Poland – 11 July 1995) was a Polish mathematician, a disciple of the Lwow School of Mathematics. He obtained his doctorate under Władysław Orlicz. Alexiewicz was an expert at functional analysis and continued and edited the work of Stefan Banach. He introduced the concept in integration theory known as the Alexiewicz norm.

== See also ==
- List of Polish mathematicians
