= List of Jewish mathematicians =

This list of Jewish mathematicians includes mathematicians and statisticians who are or were verifiably Jewish or of Jewish descent. In 1933, when the Nazis rose to power in Germany, one-third of all mathematics professors in the country were Jewish, while Jews constituted less than one percent of the population. Jewish mathematicians made major contributions throughout the 20th century and into the 21st, as is evidenced by their high representation among the winners of major mathematics awards: 27% for the Fields Medal, 30% for the Abel Prize, and 40% for the Wolf Prize.

== A ==
- Abner of Burgos (c. 1270 – c. 1347), mathematician and philosopher
- Abraham Abigdor (14th century), logician
- Milton Abramowitz (1915–1958), mathematician
- Samson Abramsky (born 1953), game semantics
- Amir Aczel (1950–2015), history of mathematics
- Georgy Adelson-Velsky (1922–2014), mathematician and computer scientist
- Abraham Adelstein (1916–1992), statistics
- Caleb Afendopolo (c. 1430 – c. 1499), mathematician, astronomer, poet, and rabbi
- Aaron Afia (16th century), mathematician, physician and philosopher
- Shmuel Agmon (1922–2025), mathematical analysis and partial differential equations
- Matest Agrest (1915–2005), mathematician and pseudoscientist
- Ron Aharoni (born 1952), combinatorics
- Bendich Ahin (14th century), mathematician and physician
- Michael Aizenman (born 1945), mathematician and physicist
- Naum Akhiezer (1901–1980), approximation theory
- Isaac Albalia (1035–1094), mathematician, astronomer, and Talmudist
- Abraham Adrian Albert (1905–1972), algebra; Cole Prize (1939)
- Félix Alcan (1841–1925), mathematician
- Semyon Alesker (born 1972), convex and integral geometry; Erdős Prize (2004)
- Al-Samawal al-Maghribi (c. 1130 – c. 1180), mathematician, astronomer and physician
- Noga Alon (born 1956), combinatorics and theoretical computer science; Erdős Prize (1989), Pólya Prize (2000)
- Franz Alt (1910–2011), mathematician and computer scientist
- Shimshon Amitsur (1921–1994), mathematician
- Jacob Anatoli (c. 1194–1256), mathematician, scientist and translator
- Kenneth Appel (1932–2013), proved four-color theorem
- Zvi Arad (1942–2018), mathematician
- Vladimir Arnold (1937–2010), mathematician; Wolf Prize (2001)
- Siegfried Aronhold (1819–1884), invariant theory
- Nachman Aronszajn (1907–1980), mathematical analysis and mathematical logic
- Kenneth Arrow (1921–2017), mathematician and economist; Nobel Prize in Economics (1972)
- Michael Artin (born 1934), algebraic geometry
- Emilio Artom (1888–1952), mathematician
- Giulio Ascoli (1843–1869), mathematician
- Guido Ascoli (1887–1957), mathematician
- Herman Auerbach (1901–1942), mathematician
- Robert Aumann (born 1930), mathematician and game theorist; Nobel Prize in Economics (2005)
- Louis Auslander (1928–1997), mathematician
- Maurice Auslander (1926–1994), algebra
- Sheldon Axler, mathematician.
- Hertha Ayrton (1854–1923), mathematician and engineer

== B ==
- Isaak Bacharach (1854–1942), mathematician
- Reinhold Baer (1902–1979), algebra
- Alan Baker (1939–2018), number theory
- Egon Balas (1922–2019), applied mathematics
- Yehoshua Bar-Hillel (1915–1975), mathematician, philosopher and linguist
- Abraham bar Hiyya (1070–1136 or 1145), mathematician, astronomer and philosopher
- Dror Bar-Natan (born 1966), knot theory and homology theory
- Ruth Barcan Marcus (1921–2012), logician
- Grigory Barenblatt (1927–2018), mathematician
- Valentine Bargmann (1908–1989), mathematician and theoretical physicist
- Elijah Bashyazi (c. 1420–1490), mathematician, astronomer, philosopher and rabbi
- Hyman Bass (born 1932), algebra and mathematics education; Cole Prize (1975)
- Laurence Baxter (1954–1996), statistician
- August Beer (1825–1863), mathematician
- Alexander Beilinson (born 1957), mathematician; Wolf Prize (2018)
- Richard Bellman (1920–1984), applied mathematics
- Kalonymus ben Kalonymus (1286 – c. 1328), philosopher, mathematician and translator
- Isaac ben Moses Eli (15th century), mathematician
- Jacob ben Nissim (10th century), philosopher and mathematician
- Judah ben Solomon (c. 1215 – c. 1274), mathematician, astronomer, and philosopher
- Paul Benacerraf (1930–2025), philosophy of mathematics
- Lazarus Bendavid (1762–1832), mathematician and philosopher
- Felix Berezin (1931–1980), mathematician and physicist
- Boris Berezovsky (1946–2013), mathematician and businessman
- Toby Berger (born 1940), information theory
- Stefan Bergman (1895–1977), complex analysis
- Paul Bernays (1888–1977), foundations of mathematics
- Benjamin Abram Bernstein (1881–1964), mathematical logic
- Dorothy Lewis Bernstein (1914–1988), applied mathematics
- Felix Bernstein (1878–1956), set theory
- Joseph Bernstein (born 1945), algebraic geometry, representation theory, and number theory
- Sergei Bernstein (1880–1968), mathematician
- Lipman Bers (1914–1993), mathematical analysis
- Ludwig Berwald (1883–1942), differential geometry
- Abram Besicovitch (1891–1970), mathematician (Karaite)
- Paul Biran (born 1969), symplectic and algebraic geometry; Erdős Prize (2006)
- Joan Birman (born 1927), topology
- Zygmunt Wilhelm Birnbaum (1903–2000), functional analysis and probability
- Max Black (1909–1988), philosopher of mathematics
- André Bloch (1893–1948), complex analysis
- Maurice Block (1816–1901), statistician
- Lenore Blum (born 1942), mathematician and computer scientist
- Leonard Blumenthal (1901–1984), mathematician
- Otto Blumenthal (1876–1944), mathematician
- Harald Bohr (1887–1951), almost periodic functions
- Vladimir Boltyansky (1925–2019), mathematician and educator
- Carl Borchardt (1817–1880), mathematical analysis
- Max Born (1882–1970), physicist and mathematician
- Moses Botarel Farissol (15th century), mathematician
- Salomon Bochner (1899–1982), mathematician; Steele Prize (1979)
- Hermann Bondi (1919–2005), mathematician
- Immanuel Bonfils (c. 1300–1377), mathematician and astronomer
- Valentina Borok (1931–2004), partial differential equations
- David Borwein (1924–2021), mathematician
- Jonathan Borwein (1951–2016), mathematician
- Peter Borwein (1953–2020), mathematician
- Raoul Bott (1923–2005), geometry; Steele Prize (1990)
- Victor Brailovsky (born 1935), mathematician and computer scientist
- Achi Brandt (born 1938), numerical analysis
- Nikolai Brashman (1796–1866), analytical geometry; Demidov Prize (1836)
- Alfred Brauer (1894–1985), number theory
- Richard Brauer (1901–1977), modular representation theory; Cole Prize (1949)
- Haïm Brezis (1944–2024), functional analysis and partial differential equations
- Selig Brodetsky (1888–1954), mathematician and President of the Board of Deputies of British Jews
- Jacob Bronowski (1908–1974), mathematician and science educator
- Robert Brooks (1952–2002), complex analysis and differential geometry
- Andrew Browder (1931–2019), functional analysis
- Felix Browder (1927–2016), nonlinear functional analysis
- William Browder (1934–2025), topology and differential geometry
- Leonid Bunimovich (born 1947), dynamical systems
- Leone Burton (1936–2007), mathematics education
- Herbert Busemann (1905–1994), convex and differential geometry

== C ==
- Anneli Cahn Lax (1922–1999), mathematician
- Eugenio Calabi (1923–2023), mathematician; Steele Prize (1991)
- Georg Cantor (1845–1918), set theorist
- Moritz Cantor (1829–1920), historian of mathematics
- Sylvain Cappell (born 1946), geometric topology
- Leonard Carlitz (1907–1999), number theory and algebra
- Moshe Carmeli (1933–2007), mathematical physics
- Emma Castelnuovo (1913–2014), mathematics education
- Guido Castelnuovo (1865–1952), mathematician
- Wilhelm Cauer (1900–1945), mathematician
- Yair Censor (born 1943), computational mathematics and optimization
- Gregory Chaitin (born 1947), algorithmic information theory and metamathematics
- Herman Chernoff (1923–2026), applied mathematics and statistics
- Alexey Chervonenkis (1938–2014), mathematician and computer scientist
- David Chudnovsky (born 1947), mathematician and engineer
- Gregory Chudnovsky (born 1952), mathematician and engineer
- Maria Chudnovsky (born 1977), graph theory and combinatorial optimization
- Henri Cohen (born 1947), number theory
- Irvin Cohen (1917–1955), mathematician
- Joel Cohen (born 1944), mathematical biology
- Marion Cohen (born 1943), poet and mathematician
- Miriam Cohen (born 1941), algebra
- Paul Cohen (1934–2007), set theorist; Fields Medal (1966)
- Ralph Cohen (born 1952), algebraic topology and differential topology
- Wim Cohen (1923–2000), queueing theory
- Paul Cohn (1924–2006), algebraist
- Stephan Cohn-Vossen (1902–1936), differential geometry
- Ronald Coifman (born 1941), mathematician
- Mordecai Comtino (died c. 1485), mathematician
- Lionel Cooper (1915–1979), mathematician
- Leo Corry (born 1956), history of mathematics
- Mischa Cotlar (1913–2007), mathematician
- Richard Courant (1888–1972), mathematical analysis and applied mathematics
- Nathan Court (1881–1968), geometer
- Michael Creizenach (1789–1842), mathematician and theologian
- Luigi Cremona (1830–1903), mathematician
- Alexander Crescenzi (17th century), mathematician

== D ==
- Noah Dana-Picard (born 1954), mathematician
- Henry Daniels (1912–2000), statistician
- David van Dantzig (1900–1959), topology
- George Dantzig (1914–2005), mathematical optimization
- Tobias Dantzig (1884–1956), mathematician
- Martin Davis (1928–2023), mathematician
- Philip Dawid (born 1946), statistics
- Max Dehn (1878–1952), topology
- Percy Deift (born 1945), mathematician; Pólya Prize (1998)
- Nissan Deliatitz (19th century), mathematician
- Joseph Delmedigo (1591–1655), rabbi and mathematician
- Ely Devons (1913–1967), statistics
- Persi Diaconis (born 1945), mathematician and magician
- Samuel Dickstein (1851–1939), mathematician and pedagogue
- Nathan Divinsky (1925–2012), mathematician
- Roland Dobrushin (1929–1995), probability theory, mathematical physics and information theory
- Wolfgang Doeblin (1915–1940), probabilist
- Domninus of Larissa (c. 420 – c. 480 AD), mathematician
- Dositheus (c. 299 - c. 201 BCE), mathematician, astronomer
- Jesse Douglas (1897–1965), mathematician; Fields Medal (1936), Bôcher Prize (1943)
- Vladimir Drinfeld (born 1954), algebraic geometry; Fields Medal (1990), Wolf Prize (2018)
- Louis Israel Dublin (1882–1969), statistician
- Aryeh Dvoretzky (1916–2008), functional analysis and probability
- Bernard Dwork (1923–1998), mathematician; Cole Prize (1962)
- Harry Dym (1938–2024), functional and numerical analysis
- Eugene Dynkin (1924–2014), probability and algebra; Steele Prize (1993)

== E ==
- Abraham Eberlen (16th century), mathematician
- Ishak Efendi (c. 1774 – 1835), mathematician and engineer
- Bradley Efron (born 1938), statistician
- Andrew Ehrenberg (1926–2010), statistician
- Tatyana Ehrenfest (1905–1984), mathematician
- Leon Ehrenpreis (1930–2010), mathematician
- Jacob Eichenbaum (1796–1861), poet and mathematician
- Samuel Eilenberg (1913–1988), category theory; Wolf Prize (1986), Steele Prize (1987)
- Gotthold Eisenstein (1823–1852), mathematician
- Yakov Eliashberg (born 1946), symplectic topology and partial differential equations
- Noam Elkies (born 1966), number theorist, pianist, and chess composer.
- Jordan Ellenberg (born 1971), arithmetic geometry
- Emanuel Lodewijk Elte (1881–1943), mathematician
- David Emmanuel (1854–1941), mathematician
- Federigo Enriques (1871–1946), algebraic geometry
- Moses Ensheim (1750–1839), mathematician and poet
- Bernard Epstein (1920–2005), mathematician and physicist
- David Epstein (born 1937), hyperbolic geometry, 3-manifolds, and group theory
- Paul Epstein (1871–1939), number theory
- Paul S. Epstein (1883–1966), mathematical physics
- Yechiel Michel Epstein (1829–1908), rabbi and mathematician
- Arthur Erdélyi (1908–1977), mathematician
- Paul Erdős (1913–1996), mathematician; Cole Prize (1951), Wolf Prize (1983/84)
- Alex Eskin (born 1965), dynamical systems and group theory
- Gregory Eskin (born 1936), partial differential equations
- Theodor Estermann (1902–1991), analytic number theory

== F ==
- Gino Fano (1871–1952), mathematician
- Yehuda Farissol (15th century), mathematician and astronomer
- Gyula Farkas (1847–1930), mathematician and physicist
- Herbert Federer (1920–2010), geometric measure theory
- Solomon Feferman (1928–2016), mathematical logic and philosophy of mathematics
- Charles Fefferman (born 1949), mathematician; Fields Medal (1978), Bôcher Prize (2008)
- Joan Feigenbaum (born 1958), mathematics and computer science
- Mitchell Feigenbaum (1944–2019), chaos theory; Wolf Prize (1986)
- Walter Feit (1930–2004), finite group theory and representation theory; Cole Prize (1965)
- Leopold Fejér (1880–1959), harmonic analysis
- Michael Fekete (1886–1957), mathematician
- Jacques Feldbau (1914–1945), mathematician
- Joel Feldman (born 1949), mathematical physics
- William Feller (1906–1970), probability theory
- Käte Fenchel (1905–1983), group theory
- Werner Fenchel (1905–1988), geometry and optimization theory
- Mordechai Finzi (c. 1407 – 1476), mathematician and astronomer
- Ernst Sigismund Fischer (1875–1954), mathematical analysis
- Abraham Fraenkel (1891–1965), set theory
- Aviezri Fraenkel (born 1929), combinatorial game theory
- Philipp Frank (1884–1966), mathematical physics and philosophy
- Péter Frankl (born 1953), combinatorics
- Fabian Franklin (1853–1939), mathematician
- Michael Freedman (born 1951), mathematician; Fields Medal (1986)
- Gregory Freiman (1926–2024), additive number theory
- Edward Frenkel (born 1968), representation theory, algebraic geometry, and mathematical physics
- Hans Freudenthal (1905–1990), algebraic topology
- Avner Friedman (born 1932), partial differential equations
- Harvey Friedman (born 1948), reverse mathematics
- Sy Friedman (born 1953), set theory and recursion theory
- David Friesenhausen (1756–1828), mathematician
- Uriel Frisch (born 1940), mathematical physics
- Albrecht Fröhlich (1916–2001), algebra; De Morgan Medal (1992)
- Robert Frucht (1906–1997), graph theory
- Guido Fubini (1879–1943), mathematical analysis
- László Fuchs (born 1924), group theory
- Lazarus Fuchs (1833–1902), linear differential equations
- Paul Funk (1886–1969), mathematical analysis
- Hillel Furstenberg (born 1935), mathematician; Wolf Prize (2006/07), Abel Prize (2020)

== G ==
- David Gabai (born 1954), low-dimensional topology and hyperbolic geometry
- Dov Gabbay (born 1945), logician
- Ofer Gabber (born 1958), algebraic geometry; Erdős Prize (1981)
- Boris Galerkin (1871–1945), mathematician and engineer
- Zvi Galil (born 1947), mathematician and computer scientist
- David Gans (1541–1613), mathematician
- Hilda Geiringer (1893–1973), mathematician
- Israel Gelfand (1913–2009), mathematician; Kyoto Prize (1989), Steele Prize (2005)
- Alexander Gelfond (1906–1968), number theory
- Semyon Gershgorin (1901–1933), mathematician
- Gersonides (1288–1344), mathematician
- Murray Gerstenhaber (1927–2024), algebra and mathematical physics
- David Gilbarg (1918–2001), mathematician
- Jekuthiel Ginsburg (1889–1957), mathematician
- Moti Gitik (born 1955), set theory
- Samuel Gitler (1933–2014), mathematician
- Alexander Givental (born 1958), symplectic topology and singularity theory
- George Glauberman (born 1941), finite simple groups
- Israel Gohberg (1928–2009), operator theory and functional analysis
- Anatolii Goldberg (1930–2008), complex analysis
- Lisa Goldberg (born 1956), statistics and mathematical finance
- Dorian Goldfeld (born 1947), number theory; Cole Prize (1987)
- Carl Wolfgang Benjamin Goldschmidt (1807–1851), mathematician
- Sydney Goldstein (1903–1989), mathematical physics
- Daniel Goldston (born 1954), number theory; Cole Prize (2014)
- Michael Golomb (1909–2008), mathematician
- Solomon Golomb (1932–2016), mathematical games
- Gene Golub (1932–2007), numerical analysis
- Marty Golubitsky (born 1945), mathematician
- Benjamin Gompertz (1779–1865), mathematician
- I. J. Good (1916–2009), mathematician and cryptologist
- Paul Gordan (1837–1912), invariant theory
- Daniel Gorenstein (1923–1992), group theory
- David Gottlieb (1944–2008), numerical analysis
- Dovid Gottlieb, rabbi and mathematician
- Ian Grant (born 1930), mathematical physics
- Harold Grad (1923–1986), applied mathematics
- Eugene Grebenik (1919–2001), demographer
- Leslie Greengard (born 1958), mathematician and computer scientist
- Kurt Grelling (1886–1942), logician
- Mikhail Gromov (born 1943), mathematician; Wolf Prize (1993), Kyoto Prize (2002), Abel Prize (2009)
- Benedict Gross (1950–2025), number theory; Cole Prize (1987)
- Marcel Grossmann (1878–1936), descriptive geometry
- Emil Grosswald (1912–1989), number theory
- Branko Grünbaum (1929–2018), discrete geometry
- Géza Grünwald (1910–1943), mathematician
- Heinrich Guggenheimer (1924–2021), mathematician
- Paul Guldin (1577–1643), mathematician and astronomer
- Emil Gumbel (1891–1966), extreme value theory
- Sigmund Gundelfinger (1846–1910), algebraic geometry
- Larry Guth (born 1977), mathematician
- Louis Guttman (1916–1987), mathematician and sociologist

== H ==
- Alfréd Haar (1885–1933), mathematician
- Steven Haberman (born 1951), statistician and actuarial scientist
- Jacques Hadamard (1865–1963), mathematician
- Hans Hahn (1879–1934), mathematical analysis and topology
- John Hajnal (1924–2008), statistics
- Heini Halberstam (1926–2014), number theory
- Paul Halmos (1916–2006), mathemematician; Steele Prize (1983)
- Israel Halperin (1911–2007), mathematician
- Georges-Henri Halphen (1844–1889), geometer
- Hans Hamburger (1889–1956), mathematician
- Haim Hanani (1912–1991), combinatorial design theory
- Frank Harary (1921–2005), graph theory
- David Harbater (born 1952), Galois theory, algebraic geometry and arithmetic geometry; Cole Prize (1995)
- David Harel (born 1950), mathematician and computer scientist
- Michael Harris (born 1954), number theory
- Sergiu Hart (born 1949), mathematician and economist
- Ami Harten (1946–1994), applied mathematics
- Numa Hartog (1846–1871), mathematician
- Friedrich Hartogs (1874–1943), set theory and several complex variables
- Herbert Hauptman (1917–2011), mathematician; Nobel Prize in Chemistry (1985)
- Felix Hausdorff (1868–1942), topology
- Louise Hay (1935–1989), computability theory
- Walter Hayman (1926–2020), complex analysis
- Hans Heilbronn (1908–1975), mathematician
- Ernst Hellinger (1883–1950), mathematician
- Eduard Helly (1884–1943), mathematician
- Dagmar Henney (1931–2023), mathematician
- Kurt Hensel (1861–1941), mathematician
- Reuben Hersh (1927–2020), mathematics and philosopher of mathematics
- Daniel Hershkowitz (born 1953), mathematician and politician
- Israel Herstein (1923–1988), algebra
- Maximilian Herzberger (1899–1982), mathematician and physicist
- Emil Hilb (1882–1929), mathematician
- Peter Hilton (1923–2010), homotopy theory
- Edith Hirsch Luchins (1921–2002), mathematician
- Kurt Hirsch (1906–1986), group theory
- Morris Hirsch (born 1933), mathematician
- Elias Höchheimer (18th century), mathematician and astronomer
- Gerhard Hochschild (1915–2010), mathematician; Steele Prize (1980)
- Melvin Hochster (born 1943), commutative algebra; Cole Prize (1980)
- Chaim Samuel Hönig (1926–2018), functional analysis
- Heinz Hopf (1894–1971), topology
- Ludwig Hopf (1884–1939), mathematician and physicist
- Janina Hosiasson-Lindenbaum (1899–1942), logician and philosopher
- Isaac Hourwich (1860–1924), statistician
- Ehud Hrushovski (born 1959), mathematical logic; Erdős Prize (1994)
- Witold Hurewicz (1904–1956), mathematician
- Adolf Hurwitz (1859–1919), function theory
- Wallie Abraham Hurwitz (1886–1958), mathematical analysis

== I ==
- Isaac ibn al-Ahdab (1350–1430), mathematician, astronomer and poet
- Sind ibn Ali (9th century), mathematician and astronomer
- Mashallah ibn Athari (c. 740 – 815), mathematician and astrologer
- Sahl ibn Bishr (c. 786 – c. 845), mathematician
- Abraham ibn Ezra (c. 1089 – c. 1167), mathematician and astronomer
- Abu al-Fadl ibn Hasdai (11th century), mathematician and philosopher
- Bashar ibn Shu'aib (10th century), mathematician
- Issachar ibn Susan (fl. 1539–1572), mathematician
- Jacob ibn Tibbon (1236–1305), mathematician and astronomer
- Moses ibn Tibbon (fl. 1240–1283), mathematician and translator
- Judah ibn Verga (15th century), mathematician, astronomer and kabbalist
- Arieh Iserles (born 1947), computational mathematics
- Isaac Israeli (14th century), astronomer and mathematician

== J ==
- Eri Jabotinsky (1910–1969), mathematician, politician and activist
- Carl Gustav Jacob Jacobi (1804–1851), analysis; first Jewish mathematician to be appointed professor at a German university
- Nathan Jacobson (1910–1999), algebra; Steele Prize (1998)
- Ernst Jacobsthal (1882–1965), number theory
- E. Morton Jellinek (1890–1963), biostatistics
- Svetlana Jitomirskaya (born 1966), dynamical systems and mathematical physics
- Ferdinand Joachimsthal (1818–1861), mathematician
- Fritz John (1910–1994), partial differential equations; Steele Prize (1982)
- Joseph of Spain (9th and 10th centuries), mathematician
- Sir Roger Jowell (1942–2011), social statistics

== K ==
- Mark Kac (1914–1984), probability theory
- Victor Kac (born 1943), representation theory; Steele Prize (2015)
- Mikhail Kadets (1923–2011), mathematical analysis
- Richard Kadison (1925–2018), mathematician; Steele Prize (1999)
- Veniamin Kagan (1869–1953), mathematician
- William Kahan (born 1933), mathematician and computer scientist; Turing Award (1989)
- Jean-Pierre Kahane (1926–2017), harmonic analysis
- Franz Kahn (1926–1998), mathematician and astrophysicist
- Margarete Kahn (1880–1942?), topology
- Gil Kalai (born 1955), mathematician; Pólya Prize (1992), Erdős Prize (1992)
- László Kalmár (1905–1976), mathematical logic
- Shoshana Kamin (born 1930), partial differential equations
- Daniel Kan (1927–2013), homotopy theory
- Leonid Kantorovich (1912–1986), mathematician and economist; Nobel Prize in Economics (1975)
- Irving Kaplansky (1917–2006), mathematician
- Samuel Karlin (1924–2007), mathematician
- Theodore von Kármán (1881–1963), mathematical physics
- Edward Kasner (1878–1955), differential geometry
- Svetlana Katok (born 1947), mathematician
- Eric Katz (born 1977), combinatorial algebraic geometry and arithmetic geometry
- Mikhail Katz (born 1958), differential geometry and geometric topology
- Nets Katz (born 1972), combinatorics and harmonic analysis
- Nick Katz (born 1943), algebraic geometry
- Sheldon Katz (born 1956), algebraic geometry
- Victor Katz (born 1942), algebra and history of mathematics
- Yitzhak Katznelson (born 1934), mathematician
- Bruria Kaufman (1918–2010), mathematician and physicist
- David Kazhdan (born 1946), representation theory
- Herbert Keller (1925–2008), applied mathematics and numerical analysis
- Joseph Keller (1923–2016), applied mathematician; National Medal of Science (1988), Wolf Prize (1997)
- John Kemeny (1926–1992), mathematician and computer scientist
- Carlos Kenig (born 1953), harmonic analysis and partial differential equations; Bôcher Prize (2008)
- Harry Kesten (1931–2019), probability; Pólya Prize (1994), Steele Prize (2001)
- Aleksandr Khinchin (1894–1959), probability theory
- David Khorol (1920–1990), mathematician
- Mojżesz Kirszbraun (1903–1942), mathematical analysis
- Sergiu Klainerman (born 1950), hyperbolic differential equations; Bôcher Prize (1999)
- Boáz Klartag (born 1978), asymptotic geometric analysis; Erdős Prize (2010)
- Morris Kline (1908–1992), mathematician
- Lipót Klug (1854–1945), mathematician
- Hermann Kober (1888–1973), mathematical analysis
- Simon Kochen (born 1934), model theory and number theory; Cole Prize (1967)
- Joseph Kohn (1932–2023), partial differential operators and complex analysis
- Ernst Kolman (1892–1972), philosophy of mathematics
- Dénes Kőnig (1884–1944), graph theorist
- Gyula Kőnig (1849–1913), mathematician
- Leo Königsberger (1837–1921), historian of mathematics
- Arthur Korn (1870–1945), mathematician and inventor
- Thomas Körner (born 1946), mathematician
- Stephan Körner (1913–2000), philosophy of mathematics
- Bertram Kostant (1928–2017), mathematician
- Edna Kramer (1902–1984), mathematician
- Mark Krasnosel'skii (1920–1997), nonlinear functional analysis
- Mark Krein (1907–1989), functional analysis; Wolf Prize (1982)
- Cecilia Krieger (1894–1974), mathematician
- Georg Kreisel (1923–2015), mathematical logic
- Maurice Kraitchik (1882–1957), number theory and recreational mathematics
- Leopold Kronecker (1823–1891), number theory
- Joseph Kruskal (1928–2010), graph theory and statistics
- Martin Kruskal (1925–2006), mathematician and physicist
- William Kruskal (1919–2005), non-parametric statistics
- Simon Kuznets (1901–1985), statistician and economist; Nobel Prize in Economics (1971)

== L ==
- Imre Lakatos (1922–1974), philosopher of mathematics
- Dan Laksov (1940–2013), algebraic geometry
- Cornelius Lanczos (1893–1974), mathematician and physicist
- Edmund Landau (1877–1938), number theory and complex analysis
- Georg Landsberg (1865–1912), complex analysis and algebraic geometry
- Serge Lang (1927–2005), number theory; Cole Prize (1960)
- Emanuel Lasker (1868–1941), mathematician and chess player
- Albert Lautman (1908–1944), philosophy of mathematics
- Ruth Lawrence (born 1971), knot theory and algebraic topology
- Peter Lax (1926–2025), mathematician; Wolf Prize (1987), Steele Prize (1993), Abel Prize (2005)
- Joel Lebowitz (born 1930), mathematical physics
- Gilah Leder (born 1941), mathematics education
- Walter Ledermann (1911–2009), algebra
- Solomon Lefschetz (1884–1972), algebraic topology and ordinary differential equations; Bôcher Prize (1924)
- Emma Lehmer (1906–2007), algebraic number theory
- Moses Lemans (1785–1832), mathematician
- Alexander Lerner (1913–2004), applied mathematics
- Arthur Levenson (1914–2007), mathematician and cryptographer
- Beppo Levi (1875–1961), mathematician
- Eugenio Levi (1883–1917), mathematician
- Friedrich Levi (1888–1966), algebra
- Leone Levi (1821–1888), statistician
- Raphael Levi Hannover (1685–1779), mathematician and astronomer
- Tullio Levi-Civita (1873–1941), tensor calculus
- Dany Leviatan (born 1942), approximation theory
- Boris Levin (1906–1993), function theory
- Leonid Levin (born 1948), foundations of mathematics and computer science
- Norman Levinson (1912–1975), mathematician; Bôcher Prize (1953)
- Richard Levins (1930–2016), biomathematician, mathematical ecologist
- Boris Levitan (1914–2004), almost periodic functions
- Jacob Levitzki (1904–1956), mathematician
- Armand Lévy (1795–1841), mathematician
- Azriel Lévy (born 1934), mathematical logic
- Hyman Levy (1889–1975), mathematician
- Paul Lévy (1886–1971), probability theory
- Tony Lévy (born 1943), history of mathematics
- Hans Lewy (1904–1988), mathematician; Wolf Prize (1986)
- Gabriel Judah Lichtenfeld (1811–1887), mathematician
- Leon Lichtenstein (1878–1933), differential equations, conformal mapping, and potential theory
- Paulette Libermann (1919–2007), differential geometry
- Elliott Lieb (born 1932), mathematical physics
- Lillian Lieber (1886–1986), mathematician and popular author
- Heinrich Liebmann (1874–1939), differential geometry
- Michael Lin (born 1942), Markov chains and ergodic theory
- Baruch Lindau (1759–1849), mathematician and science writer
- Adolf Lindenbaum (1904–1942), mathematical logic
- Elon Lindenstrauss (born 1970), mathematician; Erdős Prize (2009), Fields Medal (2010)
- Joram Lindenstrauss (1936–2012), mathematician
- Yom Tov Lipman Lipkin (1846–1876), mathematician
- Rudolf Lipschitz (1832–1903), mathematical analysis and differential geometry
- Rehuel Lobatto (1797–1866), mathematician
- Michel Loève (1907–1979), probability theory
- Charles Loewner (1893–1968), mathematician
- Alfred Loewy (1873–1935), representation theory
- Gino Loria (1862–1954), mathematician and historian of mathematics
- Leopold Löwenheim (1878–1957), mathematical logic
- Baruch Solomon Löwenstein (19th century), mathematician
- Alexander Lubotzky (born 1956), mathematician and politician; Erdős Prize (1990)
- Eugene Lukacs (1906–1987), statistician
- Yudell Luke (1918–1983), function theory
- Jacob Lurie (born 1977), mathematician; Breakthrough Prize (2014)
- George Lusztig (born 1946), mathematician; Cole Prize (1985), Steele Prize (2008)
- Israel Lyons (1739–1775), mathematician
- Lazar Lyusternik (1899–1981), topology and differential geometry

== M ==
- Myrtil Maas (1792–1865), mathematician
- Moshé Machover (born 1936), mathematician, philosopher and activist
- Menachem Magidor (born 1946), set theory
- Ludwig Immanuel Magnus (1790–1861), geometer
- Kurt Mahler (1903–1988), mathematician; De Morgan Medal (1971)
- Yuri Manin (1937–2023), algebraic geometry and diophantine geometry
- Henry Mann (1905–2000), number theory and statistics; Cole Prize (1946)
- Amédée Mannheim (1831–1906), mathematician and inventor of the slide rule
- Eli Maor (born 1937), history of mathematics
- Solomon Marcus (1925–2016), mathematical analysis, mathematical linguistics and computer science
- Szolem Mandelbrojt (1899–1983), mathematical analysis
- Benoit Mandelbrot (1924–2010), mathematician; Wolf Prize (1993)
- Grigory Margulis (born 1946), mathematician; Fields Medal (1978), Wolf Prize (2005), Abel Prize (2020)
- Edward Marczewski (1907–1976), mathematician
- Karl Marx (1818–1883), history of mathematics
- Michael Maschler (1927–2008), game theory
- Walther Mayer (1887–1948), mathematician
- Barry Mazur (born 1937), mathematician; Cole Prize (1982)
- Vladimir Mazya (born 1937), mathematical analysis and partial differential equations
- Naum Meiman (1912–2001), complex analysis, partial differential equations, and mathematical physics
- Nathan Mendelsohn (1917–2006), discrete mathematics
- Karl Menger (1902–1985), mathematician
- Abraham Joseph Menz (18th century), mathematician and rabbi
- Yves Meyer (born 1939), mathematician; Abel Prize (2017)
- Ernest Michael (1925–2013), general topology
- Solomon Mikhlin (1908–1990), mathematician
- David Milman (1912–1982), functional analysis
- Pierre Milman (born 1945), mathematician
- Vitali Milman (born 1939), mathematical analysis
- Hermann Minkowski (1864–1909), number theory
- Richard von Mises (1883–1953), mathematician and engineer
- Elijah Mizrachi (c. 1455 – c. 1525), mathematician and rabbi
- Boris Moishezon (1937–1993), mathematician
- Louis Mordell (1888–1972), number theory
- Claus Moser (1922–2015), statistics
- George Mostow (1923–2017), mathematician; Wolf Prize (2013)
- Andrzej Mostowski (1913–1975), set theory
- Simon Motot (15th century), algebra
- Theodore Motzkin (1908–1970), mathematician
- José Enrique Moyal (1910–1998), mathematical physics
- Herman Müntz (1884–1956), mathematician

== N ==
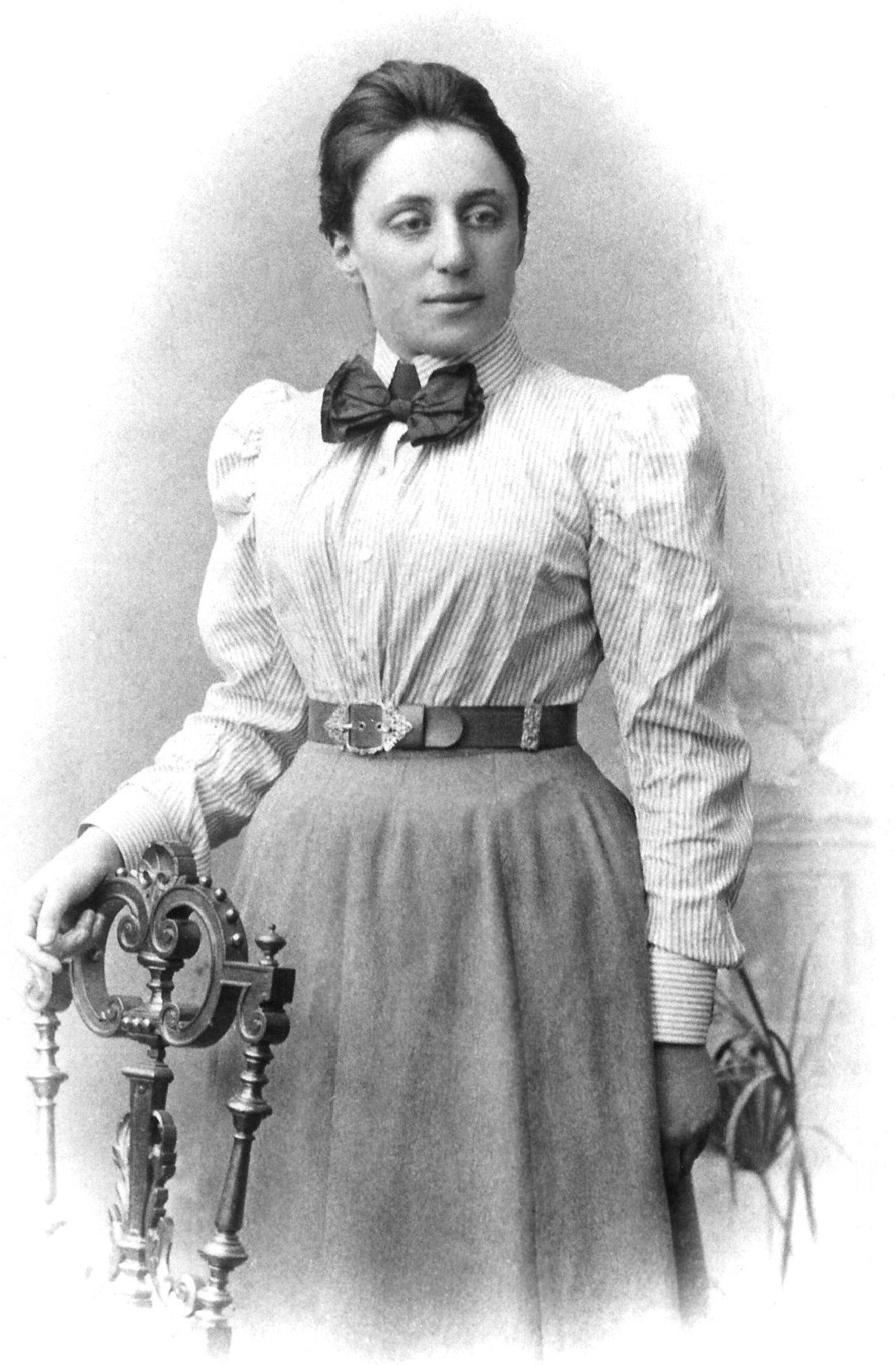
Emmy Noether

- Leopoldo Nachbin (1922–1993), topology and harmonic analysis
- Assaf Naor (born 1975), metric spaces; Bôcher Prize (1999)
- Isidor Natanson (1906–1964), real analysis and constructive function theory
- Melvyn Nathanson (born 1944), number theory
- Caryn Navy (born 1953), set-theoretic topology
- Mark Naimark (1909–1978), functional analysis and mathematical physics
- Zeev Nehari (1915–1978), mathematical analysis
- Rabbi Nehemiah (fl. c. 150), mathematician
- Leonard Nelson (1882–1927), mathematician and philosopher
- Paul Neményi (1895–1952), mathematician and physicist
- Peter Nemenyi (1927–2002), mathematician
- Abraham Nemeth (1918–2013), mathematician and creator of Nemeth Braille
- Arkadi Nemirovski (born 1947), optimization
- Elisha Netanyahu (1912–1986), complex analysis
- Bernhard Neumann (1909–2003), group theory
- John von Neumann (1903–1957), set theory, physics and computer science; Bôcher Prize (1938)
- Hanna Neumann (1914–1971), group theory
- Klára Dán von Neumann (1911–1963), mathematician and computer scientist
- Nelli Neumann (1886–1942), synthetic geometry
- Max Newman (1897–1984), mathematician and codebreaker; De Morgan Medal (1962)
- Abraham Niederländer (16th century), mathematician and scribe
- Louis Nirenberg (1925–2020), mathematical analysis; Bôcher Prize (1959), Steele Prize (1994), Chern Medal (2010), Abel Prize (2015)
- Emmy Noether (1882–1935), algebra and theoretical physics
- Fritz Noether (1884–1941), mathematician
- Max Noether (1844–1921), algebraic geometry and algebraic functions
- Simon Norton (1952–2019), group theory
- Pedro Nunes (1502–1578), mathematician and cosmographer
- A. Edward Nussbaum (1925–2009), mathematician and theoretical physicist

== O ==
- David Oppenheim (1664–1736), rabbi and mathematician
- Menachem Oren (1903–1962), mathematician and chess master
- Donald Ornstein (born 1934), ergodic theory; Bôcher Prize (1974)
- Mollie Orshansky (1915–2006), statistics
- Steven Orszag (1943–2011), applied mathematics
- Stanley Osher (born 1942), applied mathematics
- Robert Osserman (1926–2011), geometry
- Alexander Ostrowski (1893–1986), mathematician
- Jacques Ozanam (1640–1718), mathematician

== P–Q ==
- Alessandro Padoa (1868–1937), mathematician and logician
- Emanuel Parzen (1929–2016), statistician
- Seymour Papert (1928–2016), mathematician and computer scientist
- Moritz Pasch (1843–1930), foundations of geometry
- Judea Pearl (1936-), mathematics (statistical reasoning), computer science and philosophy.
- Chaim Pekeris (1908–1992), mathematician and physicist
- Daniel Pedoe (1910–1998), geometry
- Rudolf Peierls (1907–1995), physics and applied mathematics; Copley Medal (1996)
- Rose Peltesohn (1913–1998), combinatorics
- Grigori Perelman (born 1966), mathematician; Fields Medal (2006, declined), Millennium Prize (2010)
- Yakov Perelman (1882–1942), recreational mathematics
- Micha Perles (born 1936), graph theory and discrete geometry
- Leo Perutz (1882–1957), mathematician and novelist
- Rózsa Péter (1905–1977), recursion theory
- Ralph Phillips (1913–1998), functional analysis; Steele Prize (1997)
- Ilya Piatetski-Shapiro (1929–2009), mathematician; Wolf Prize (1990)
- Georg Pick (1859–1942), mathematician
- Salvatore Pincherle (1853–1936), functional analysis
- Abraham Plessner (1900–1961), functional analysis
- Felix Pollaczek (1892–1981), number theory, mathematical analysis, mathematical physics and probability theory
- Harriet Pollatsek (born 1942), mathematician
- Leonid Polterovich (born 1963), symplectic geometry and dynamical systems; Erdős Prize (1998)
- George Pólya (1887–1985), combinatorics, number theory, numerical analysis and probability
- Carl Pomerance (born 1944), number theory
- Alfred van der Poorten (1942–2010), number theory
- Emil Post (1897–1954), mathematician and logician
- Mojżesz Presburger (1904 – c. 1943), mathematician and logician
- Vera Pless (1931–2020), combinatorics
- Ilya Prigogine (1917–2003), statistician and chemist; Nobel Prize in Chemistry (1977)
- Alfred Pringsheim (1850–1941), analysis, theory of functions
- Moshe Provençal (1503–1576) mathematician, posek and grammarian
- Hilary Putnam (1926–2016), philosophy of mathematics

== R ==
- Michael Rabin (1931–2026), mathematical logic and computer science; Turing Award (1976)
- Philip Rabinowitz (1926–2006), numerical analysis
- Giulio Racah (1909–1965), mathematician and physicist
- Richard Rado (1906–1989), mathematician
- Aleksander Rajchman (1890–1940), measure theory
- Rose Rand (1903–1980), logician and philosopher
- Joseph Raphson (c. 1648 – c. 1715), mathematician
- Anatol Rapoport (1911–2007), applied mathematics
- Marina Ratner (1938–2017), ergodic theory
- Yitzchak Ratner (1857–?), mathematician
- Amitai Regev (born 1940), ring theory
- Isaac Samuel Reggio (1784–1855), mathematician and rabbi
- Hans Reissner (1874–1967), mathematical physics
- Robert Remak (1888–1942), algebra and mathematical economics
- Evgeny Remez (1895–1975), constructive function theory
- Alfréd Rényi (1921–1970), combinatorics, number theory and probability
- Ida Rhodes (1900–1986), mathematician
- Paulo Ribenboim (born 1928), number theory
- Ken Ribet (born 1948), algebraic number theory and algebraic geometry
- Frigyes Riesz (1880–1956), functional analysis
- Marcel Riesz (1886–1969), mathematician
- Eliyahu Rips (born 1948), geometric group theory; Erdős Prize (1979)
- Joseph Ritt (1893–1951), differential algebra
- Igor Rivin (born 1961), hyperbolic geometry, topology, group theory, experimental mathematics.
- Abraham Robinson (1918–1974), nonstandard analysis
- Olinde Rodrigues (1795–1851), mathematician and social reformer
- Werner Rogosinski (1894–1964), mathematician
- Vladimir Rokhlin (1919–1984), mathematician
- Werner Romberg (1909–2003), mathematician and physicist
- Jakob Rosanes (1842–1922), algebraic geometry and invariant theory
- Johann Rosenhain (1816–1887), mathematician
- Louis Rosenhead (1906–1984), applied mathematics
- Maxwell Rosenlicht (1924–1999), algebra; Cole Prize (1960)
- Arthur Rosenthal (1887–1959), mathematician
- Klaus Roth (1925–2015), diophantine approximation; Fields Medal (1958)
- Leonard Roth (1904–1968), algebraic geometry
- Uriel Rothblum (1947–2012), mathematician and operations researcher
- Bruce Rothschild (born 1941), combinatorics; Pólya Prize (1971)
- Linda Preiss Rothschild (born 1945), mathematician
- Arthur Rubin (born 1956), mathematician and aerospace engineer
- Karl Rubin (born 1956), elliptic curves; Cole Prize (1992)
- Reuven Rubinstein (1938–2012), probability theory and statistics
- Walter Rudin (1921–2010), mathematical analysis
- Zeev Rudnick (born 1961), number theory and mathematical physics; Erdős Prize (2001)

== S ==
- Saadia Gaon (882 or 892–942), rabbi, philosopher and mathematician
- Louis Saalschütz (1835–1913), number theory and mathematical analysis
- Cora Sadosky (1940–2010), mathematical analysis
- Manuel Sadosky (1914–2005), mathematician and computer scientist
- Philip Saffman (1931–2008), applied mathematics
- Stanisław Saks (1897–1942), measure theory
- Raphaël Salem (1898–1963), mathematician
- Hans Samelson (1916–2005), differential geometry, topology, Lie groups and Lie algebras
- Ester Samuel-Cahn (1933–2015), statistician
- Peter Sarnak (born 1953), analytic number theory; Pólya Prize (1998), Cole Prize (2005), Wolf Prize (2014)
- Leonard Jimmie Savage (1917–1971), mathematician and statistician
- Shlomo Sawilowsky (1954–2021), statistician
- Hermann Schapira (1840–1898), mathematician
- Malka Schaps (born 1948), mathematician
- Michelle Schatzman (1949–2010), applied mathematics
- Robert Schatten (1911–1977), functional analysis
- Juliusz Schauder (1899–1943), functional analysis and partial differential equations
- Menahem Max Schiffer (1911–1997), complex analysis, partial differential equations, and mathematical physics
- Ludwig Schlesinger (1864–1933), mathematician
- Lev Schnirelmann (1905–1938), calculus of variations, topology and number theory
- Isaac Schoenberg (1903–1990), mathematician
- Arthur Schoenflies (1853–1928), mathematician
- Moses Schönfinkel (1889–1942), combinatory logic
- Oded Schramm (1961–2008), conformal field theory and probability theory; Erdős Prize (1996), Pólya Prize (2006)
- Józef Schreier (1909–1943), functional analysis, group theory and combinatorics
- Otto Schreier (1901–1929), group theory
- Issai Schur (1875–1941), group representations, combinatorics and number theory
- Arthur Schuster (1851–1934), applied mathematics; Copley Medal (1931)
- Albert Schwarz (born 1934), differential topology
- Karl Schwarzschild (1873–1916), mathematical physics
- Jacob Schwartz (1930–2009), mathematician
- Laurent Schwartz (1915–2002), mathematician; Fields Medal (1950)
- Marie-Hélène Schwartz (1913–2013), mathematician
- Richard Schwartz (born 1934), mathematician and activist
- Irving Segal (1918–1998), functional and harmonic analysis
- Lee Segel (1932–2005), applied mathematics
- Beniamino Segre (1903–1977), algebraic geometry
- Corrado Segre (1863–1924), algebraic geometry
- Wladimir Seidel (1907–1981), mathematician
- Esther Seiden (1908–2014), statistics
- Abraham Seidenberg (1916–1988), algebra
- Gary Seitz (1943–2023), group theory
- Zlil Sela (born 1962), geometric group theory; Erdős Prize (2003)
- Reinhard Selten (1930–2016), mathematician and game theorist; Nobel Prize in Economics (1994)
- Valery Senderov (1945–2014), mathematician
- Aner Shalev (born 1958), group theory
- Jeffrey Shallit (born 1957), number theory and computer science
- Adi Shamir (born 1952), mathematician and cryptographer; Erdős Prize (1983)
- Eli Shamir (born 1934), mathematician and computer scientist
- Harold Shapiro (1928–2021), approximation theory and functional analysis
- Samuil Shatunovsky (1859–1929), mathematical analysis and algebra
- Henry Sheffer (1882–1964), logician
- Saharon Shelah (born 1945), mathematician; Erdős Prize (1977), Pólya Prize (1992), Wolf Prize (2001)
- James Shohat (1886–1944), mathematical analysis
- Naum Shor (1937–2006), optimization
- William Sidis (1898–1944), mathematician and child prodigy
- Barry Simon (born 1946), mathematical physicist; Steele Prize (2016)
- Leon Simon (born 1945), mathematician; Bôcher Prize (1994)
- Max Simon (1844–1918), history of mathematics
- James Simons (1938–2024), mathematician and hedge fund manager
- Yakov Sinai (born 1935), dynamical systems; Wolf Prize (1997), Steele Prize (2013), Abel Prize (2014)
- Isadore Singer (1924–2021), mathematician; Bôcher Prize (1969), Steele Prize (2000), Abel Prize (2004)
- Abraham Sinkov (1907–1998), mathematician and cryptanalyst
- Hayyim Selig Slonimski (1810–1904), mathematician and astronomer; Demidov Prize (1844)
- Raymond Smullyan (1919–2017), mathematician and philosopher
- Alan Sokal (born 1955), combinatorics and mathematical physics
- Robert Solovay (born 1938), set theory
- David Spiegelhalter (born 1953), statistician
- Daniel Spielman (born 1970), applied mathematics and computer science; Pólya Prize (2014)
- Frank Spitzer (1996–1992), probability theory
- Guido Stampacchia (1922–1978), mathematician
- Elias Stein (1931–2018), harmonic analysis; Wolf Prize (1999), Steele Prize (2002)
- Robert Steinberg (1922–2014), mathematician
- Mark Steiner (1942–2020), philosophy of mathematics
- Hugo Steinhaus (1887–1972), mathematician
- Ernst Steinitz (1871–1928), algebra
- Moritz Steinschneider (1816–1907), history of mathematics
- Abraham Stern (c. 1762 – 1842), mathematician and inventor
- Moritz Abraham Stern (1807–1894), first Jewish full professor at a German university
- Shlomo Sternberg (1936–2024), mathematician
- Reinhold Strassmann (1893–1944), mathematician
- Ernst Straus (1922–1983), analytic number theory, graph theory and combinatorics
- Steven Strogatz (born 1959), nonlinear systems and applied mathematics
- Daniel Stroock (1940–2025), probability theory
- Bella Subbotovskaya (1938–1982), mathematician and founder of the Jewish People's University
- Benny Sudakov (born 1969), combinatorics
- James Joseph Sylvester (1814–1897), mathematician; Copley Medal (1880), De Morgan Medal (1887)
- Otto Szász (1884–1952), real analysis
- Gábor Szegő (1895–1985), mathematical analysis
- Esther Szekeres (1910–2005), mathematician
- George Szekeres (1911–2005), mathematician

== T–U ==
- Dov Tamari (1911–2006), logic and combinatorics
- Jacob Tamarkin (1888–1945), mathematical analysis
- Éva Tardos (born 1957), mathematician and computer scientist
- Alfred Tarski (1901–1983), logician, mathematician, and philosopher
- Alfred Tauber (1866–1942), mathematical analysis
- Olga Taussky (1906–1995), algebraic number theory and algebra
- Olry Terquem (1782–1862), mathematician
- Otto Toeplitz (1881–1940), linear algebra and functional analysis
- Jakow Trachtenberg (1888–1953), mathematician and mental calculator
- Avraham Trahtman (1944–2024), combinatorics
- Boris Trakhtenbrot (1921–2016), mathematical logic
- Boaz Tsaban (born 1973), set theory and nonabelian cryptology
- Boris Tsirelson (1950–2020), probability theory and functional analysis
- Pál Turán (1910–1976), number theory
- Eli Turkel (born 1944), applied mathematics
- Stanislaw Ulam (1909–1984), mathematician
- Fritz Ursell (1923–2012), mathematician
- Pavel Urysohn (1898–1924), dimension theory and topology

== V ==
- Vladimir Vapnik (born 1936), mathematician and computer scientist
- Moshe Vardi (born 1954), mathematical logic and theoretical computer science
- Andrew Vázsonyi (1916–2003), mathematician and operations researcher
- Anatoly Vershik (1933–2024), mathematician
- Naum Vilenkin (1920–1991), combinatorics
- Vilna Gaon (1720–1797), Talmudist and mathematician
- Giulio Vivanti (1859–1949), mathematician
- Aizik Volpert (1923–2006), mathematician and chemical engineer
- Vito Volterra (1860–1940), functional analysis
- Vladimir Vranić (1896–1976), probability and statistics

== W ==
- Friedrich Waismann (1896–1950), mathematician and philosopher
- Abraham Wald (1902–1950), decision theory, geometry and econometrics
- Henri Wald (1920–2002), logician
- Arnold Walfisz (1892–1962), analytic number theory
- Stefan Warschawski (1904–1989), mathematician
- Wolfgang Wasow (1909–1993), singular perturbation theory
- André Weil (1906–1998), number theory and algebraic geometry; Wolf Prize (1979), Steele Prize (1980), Kyoto Prize (1994)
- Shmuel Weinberger (born 1963), topology
- Alexander Weinstein (1897–1979), applied mathematics
- Eric Weinstein (born 1965), mathematical physics
- Boris Weisfeiler (1942–1985?), algebraic geometry
- Benjamin Weiss (born 1941), mathematician
- Wendelin Werner (born 1968), probability theory and mathematical physics; Pólya Prize (2006), Fields Medal (2006)
- Eléna Wexler-Kreindler (1931–1992), algebra
- Harold Widom (1932–2021), operator theory and random matrices; Pólya Prize (2002)
- Norbert Wiener (1894–1964), mathematician; Bôcher Prize (1933)
- Avi Wigderson (born 1956), mathematician and computer scientist, Abel Prize (2021)
- Eugene Wigner (1902–1995), mathematician and theoretical physicist; Nobel Prize in Physics (1963)
- Ernest Julius Wilczynski (1876–1932), geometer
- Herbert Wilf (1931–2012), combinatorics and graph theory
- Aurel Wintner (1903–1958), mathematician
- Daniel Wise (born 1971), geometric group theory and 3-manifolds
- Edward Witten (born 1951), mathematical physics; Fields Medal (1990), Kyoto Prize (2014)
- Ludwig Wittgenstein (1889–1951), logic and philosophy of mathematics
- Julius Wolff (1882–1945), mathematician
- Jacob Wolfowitz (1910–1981), statistics
- Paul Wolfskehl (1856–1906), mathematician
- Mario Wschebor (1939–2011), probability and statistics

== X–Z ==
- Mordecai Yoffe (c. 1530 – 1612), rabbi and mathematician
- Akiva Yaglom (1921–2007), probability and statistics
- Isaak Yaglom (1921–1988), mathematician
- Sofya Yanovskaya (1896–1966), logic and history of mathematics
- Adolph Yushkevich (1906–1993), history of mathematics
- Abraham Zacuto (1452 – c. 1515), mathematician and astronomer
- Lotfi Zadeh (1921–2017), fuzzy mathematics
- Pedro Zadunaisky (1917–2009), mathematician and astronomer
- Don Zagier (born 1951), number theory; Cole Prize (1987)
- Elijah Zahalon (18th century), mathematician and Talmudist
- Zygmunt Zalcwasser (1898–1943), mathematician
- Victor Zalgaller (1920–2020), geometry and optimization
- Israel Zamosz (c. 1700 – 1772), Talmudist and mathematician
- Oscar Zariski (1899–1986), algebraic geometer; Cole Prize (1944), Wolf Prize (1981), Steele Prize (1981)
- Edouard Zeckendorf (1901–1983), number theory
- Doron Zeilberger (born 1950), combinatorics
- Daniel Zelinsky (1922-2015), algebra; chair Northwestern mathematics department, Guggenheim fellow
- Efim Zelmanov (born 1955), mathematician; Fields Medal (1994)
- Tamar Ziegler (born 1971), ergodic theory and arithmetic combinatorics; Erdős Prize (2011)
- Leo Zippin (1905–1995), solved Hilbert's fifth problem
- Abraham Ziv (1940–2013), number theory
- Benedict Zuckermann (1818–1891), mathematician and historian
- Moses Zuriel (16th century), mathematician

== See also ==
- Lists of Jews
- List of Jewish Ukrainian mathematicians
- Mishnat ha-Middot
