= List of medieval Hebrew astronomers =

The following is a list of prominent Jewish astronomers of the Middle Ages, with the approximate periods of their activity, arranged in alphabetical order of first names.

Name	Date	Known for
Abraham de Balmes	died 1523	Translator
Abraham ibn Ezra	1093-1168	
Abraham bar Hiyya Ha-Nasi	1130	
Abraham of Toledo	1278	
Abraham Zacuto ben Samuel	16th century	
Andruzagar ben Zadi Faruch	9th century	
Augustinius Ricius	1521	
Baruch Sklow	c. 1777	
Baruch ben Solomon ben Joab	1457	
Bianchino	15th century	
Bonet de Lattes	1506	
Caleb Afendopolo	15th century	
David Gans	died 1613	
David Kalonymus ben Jacob	1464	
David ibn Nahmias		
David Nieto	died 1728	
Dayyan Ḥasan	972	
Elijah Mizrachi	died 1526	
Emanuel ben Jacob	1346-65	
Ephraim Mizraḥi		
Farissol Moses Botarel	1465	
Hananeel ben Ḥushiel	died 1020?	
Ḥayyim Lisker	1612-36	
Ḥayyim Vital Calabrese	died 1620	
Isaac ben Aaron	1368	
Isaac Abu al-Khair ben Samuel	1340	
Isaac Albalia ben Baruch	1035-94	
Isaac ibn al-Ḥadib	1370	
Isaac Israeli ben Joseph	1310-30	
Isaac ben Meir Spira		
Isaac ben Moses Efodaeus, Proflat Duran	1392-1403	
Isaac ibn Sid	1252	
Israel Lyons	died 1775	
Israel Samose	died 1772	
Jacob Anatoli	1232	
Jacob Carsi (Jacob al-Corsono ben Abi Abraham Isaac)	1376	
Jacob ben David ben Yom-Ṭob Poel	1361	
Jacob ben Elia		
Jacob ben Judah Cabret	1382	
Jacob ben Makir, Proflat Tibbon	1289-1303	
Jacob ben Samson	1123-42	
Jacob ben Tarik or Yaʿqūb ibn Ṭāriq	777	Said to have founded a school of astrology and astronomy in Baghdad
Jeremiah Cohen of Palermo	1486	
Joseph ben Eleazar	14th century	
Joseph ben Isaac ben Moses ibn Wakkar	c. 1357	
Joseph ben Israeli ben Isaac	died 1331	
Joseph ibn Nahmias	1300-30	
Joseph Parsi		
Joseph Taytazak	c. 1520	
Judah Farissol	1499	
Judah ha-Levi	1140	
Judah ben Israeli	1339	
Judah ben Moses Cohen	1256	
Judah ben Rakufial	before 1130	
Judah ben Samuel Shalom	15th century	
Judah ben Solomon Cohen	1247	
Judah ibn Verga	1457	
Kalonymus ben David of Naples	1528	
Kalonymus ben Kalonymus	1286-1328	
Levi ben Abraham ben Ḥayyim	1299-1316	
Levi ben Gershon (Gersonides)	1327-44	
Maimon of Montpellier.		
Manoah ben Shemariyah	died 1612	
Mashallah	754-813	
Mattathia Delacrut	c. 1530-50	
Meier Neumark	1703	
Meir Spira	14th century?	
Menahem (Emanuel) Zion Porto	1636-40	
Meshullam Kalonymus		
Mordecai Comtino	1460-85	
Mordecai Finzi	1440-46	
Moses ben Abraham of Nîmes		
Moses Almosnino	died c. 1580	
Moses Galeno ben Elia	16th century	
Moses Goli ben Judah		
Moses Ḥandali		
Moses Isserles	died 1573	
Moses ibn Tibbon	1244-74	
Nathan Hamati ben Eliezer	1279-83	
Raphael Leki Hannover	1734	
Sahl (Rabban) al-Ṭabari	800	
Samuel ibn Abbas ben Judah	1163	
Samuel Abulafia	1278	
Samuel Ha-Levi	1280-84	
Samuel ben Judah of Marseilles	1331	
Shalom ben Joseph	1450-60	
Shalom ben Solomon Yerushalmi	1482-87	
Shabbethai Donnolo	913-982	
Sheshet ben Isaac ben Gerundi	1320	
Sind ben Ali	829-833	
Solomon Abigdor ben Abraham	1399	
Solomon Davin of Rodez	14th century	
Solomon ben Elijah	1344-86	
Solomon Esobi (Azubius)	1633	
Solomon ben Moses Melgueil	1250	
Solomon ibn Pater Cohen of Burgos	1322	
Solomon Shalom ben Moses	1441-86	
Tobias Cohen	1708	

- Source
