= Farissol =

Farissol is a Jewish surname.

People with the surname include:

- Abraham Farissol (c. 1451–1525 or 1526), Jewish-Italian mathematician and astronomer
- Jacob ben Chayyim Comprat Vidal Farissol (fl. 1422–1453), Provençal Jewish scholar
- Moses Botarel Farissol, 15th-century Jewish astronomer and mathematician
- Yehuda Farissol (fl. 1499), Jewish-Italian mathematician and astronomer
