= Joseph Löb Sossnitz =

Russian-American scholar (1837–1910)

- Born: Joseph Judah Löb Sossnitz; 17 September 1837 Birzhi, Kovno Governorate, Russian Empire
- Died: 2 March 1910 (aged 72) New York City, New York, United States
- Language: Hebrew
- Literary movement: Haskalah

Joseph Judah Löb Sossnitz (Yiddish: יוסף יהודה ליב בן יחיאל מיכל זאָסניץ, romanized: Yosef Yehudah Leyb ben Yekhiel Mikhel Zosnitz; 17 September 1837 – 2 March 1910) was a Russian–American Talmudic scholar, philosopher, educator, and scientific writer.

== Biography ==
Sossnitz was born into a Hasidic family in Birzhi, Kovno Governorate, in 1837. At the age of ten, he compiled a calendar for the year 5608 (1847–48). At nineteen, he moved to Riga to teach Hebrew. He was granted access to the library of the city's polytechnical school, where he studied German and secular sciences.

In 1875, he received an invitation from Hayyim Selig Slonimski to join him as co-editor of Ha-Tzefirah in Berlin. However, due to his refusal to write against Slonimski's rival Gabriel Judah Lichtenfeld, he was dismissed from this position. In 1888, Sossnitz relocated to Warsaw, assuming the role of editor for the scientific and Kabbalistic sections of Ha-Eshkol. He moved to New York in 1891, where, in 1893, he established a Talmud Torah on 104th street, serving as its principal until 1897. From 1899 onward, he lectured on Jewish ethics at the Educational Alliance. Among his students was Mordecai Kaplan, who credited Sossnitz as contributing to his "intellectual and spiritual development".

== Publications ==
- Akhen yesh Adonai [Indeed, There Is a God] (in Hebrew). Vilna: Y. L. Lipman Metz. 1875. hdl:2027/uc1.ax0000166025. A critique of modern materialism and Büchner's Kraft und Stoff.
- Ha-shemesh [The Sun] (in Hebrew). Vilna: Y. L. Lipman Metz. 1877. A scientific essay on the composition of the sun, based on contemporary research and accompanied by astronomical tables.
- Seḥoḳ ha-shakh [The Game of Chess] (in Hebrew). Vilna. 1879. hdl:2027/hvd.hwpsdv. A manual on chess based on Alphons von Breda's method.
- Der eviger kalender [The Perpetual Calendar] (in Yiddish). Riga. 1884.
- 'Iddan 'olamim (in Hebrew). Warsaw: Y. Briz Unterhendler. 1888. A perpetual calendar for Jews, Christians, and Muslims, with comparative tables.
- Ha-ma'or [The Luminary] (in Hebrew). Warsaw: Y. Unterhendler. 1889. hdl:2027/hvd.hwmh7a. An essay on Jewish religious philosophy, supplemented with notes on Biblical and Talmudical exegesis.
