= Ferdinand Joachimsthal =

German mathematician

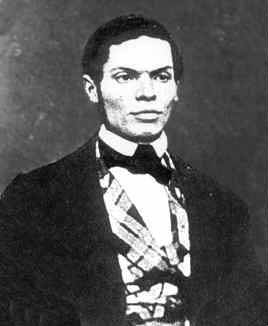
Ferdinand Joachimsthal

Ferdinand Joachimsthal was a German mathematician.

He was born on March 9, 1818, at Goldberg (Złotoryja), Silesia and died on April 5, 1861, at Breslau (Wrocław). In the year of his graduation (Ph.D., Berlin, 1842) he was appointed teacher at a Realschule in Berlin, and in 1846 was admitted to the philosophical faculty of the university as privatdozent. In 1856, he was appointed professor of mathematics at Halle, and in 1858 at Breslau.

Joachimsthal, who was Jewish, contributed essays to Crelle's Journal, 1846, 1850, 1854, 1861, and to Olry Terquem's Nouvelles Annales de Mathématiques.

He is known for Joachimsthal's Equation and Joachimsthal Notation , both associated with conic sections.

== Works ==
- 1848: "Sur les normales infiniment voisines d'une surface courbe", Crelle's Journal 13: 415–22
- 1863: Elemente der analytischen Geometrie der Ebene via Internet Archive
- 1872: Anwendung der Differential- und Integralrechnung via Internet Archive
