= Isaiah Beer Bing =

French writer, translator, and Hebraist

- Born: 1759; Metz, Three Bishoprics, Kingdom of France
- Died: 21 July 1805 (aged 45); Paris, First French Empire
- Spouse: Eve Cahen Silny (1761–1796)
- Relatives: Michel Berr (son-in-law)
- Writing career
- Language: French, Hebrew
- Literary movement: Haskalah

Isaiah Beer Bing (Hebrew: ישי בער בינג, French: Isaïe Berr Bing; 1759 – 21 July 1805) was a French writer, translator, and Hebraist. He was one of the first members from France of the Haskalah movement.

== Biography ==
Isaiah Beer Bing was born in Metz to a distinguished Jewish family, the son of merchant Moyse Hayem Bing. Inspired by the work of Moses Mendelssohn, he entered early upon a literary career, and at the age of twenty-five published French and Hebrew translations of Mendelssohn's Phaedon, under the titles Phédon, ou Traité sur l'immortalité de l'âme and Fedon: hu sefer hashʼarat ha-nefesh.

He attracted the attention of Abbé Grégoire, Mirabeau, de la Fayette, and Roederer, by his pamphlets on behalf of the Jews in the late 1780s, and especially by his Lettre, in which he defended his coreligionists against the anti-Semitic attacks of Aubert du Bayet. Indeed, it was at Beer Bing's suggestion that Abbé Grégoire published his Essai sur la régénération physique, morale et politique des juifs ('An essay on the physical, moral, and political reformation of the Jews'). He was appointed to the 1878 Malesherbes Commission on the emancipation of French Jews, and addressed the National Assembly the following year on behalf of the Jews of Lorraine. He became a member of the Metz municipal council in 1790.

As a member of its editorial committee, Beer Bing contributed numerous literary compositions to the journal La Décade philosophique, including a translation of Lessing's drama Nathan the Wise. Especially noteworthy were translations into French of Jedaiah ha-Penini's Beḥinat ha-olam ('Examination of the World') and Judah ha-Levi's Tzion ha-lo tishali ('Zion, Will You Not Inquire'), both of which were included in Abbé Grégoire's Essai. In 1792 he issued a French translation of Moïse Ensheim's "Hebrew La Marseillaise", La-menatze'aḥ shir ('To the Conductor, a Song'), albeit with its biblical references removed.

Beer Bing was forced to interrupt his literary career to secure means to provide for his large family, and he obtained the position of administrator of the Salines de l'Est saltworks. He died at Paris on 21 July 1805, at the age of 45.

== Publications ==
- Traduction de l'Hymne ou Cantique Hébraïque, que les Juifs de Metz ont récité, et fait exécuter en musique dans leurs Synagogue, le 18 Novembre 1781, jour de réjouissance faite pour la naissance de Monseigneur le Dauphin. Metz. 1781.
- Phédon, ou Traité sur l'immortalité de l'âme. Berlin. 1786.
- Fedon: hu sefer hashʼarat ha-nefesh. Berlin. 1786. With preface and commendatory verses by Naphtali Hirz Wessely.
- Lettre du Sr. I. B. B., juif de Metz, à l'auteur anonyme d'un écrit intitulé: " Le Cri du citoyen contre les juifs ". Metz: Jean-Baptiste Collignon. 1787.
- Mémoire particulier pour la communauté des Juifs établis à Metz. 1789.
- Cantique composée par le Citoyen Moyse Ensheim, à l'occasion de la fête civique célébrée à Metz, le 21 octobre, l'an 1er de la République, dans le Temple des Citoyens Israëlites. Metz. 1792.
