= Yitzchak Ratner =

Nineteenth century mathematician

Yitzchak ben Nechemia Ratner (Hebrew: יצחק בן נחמיה ראטנער; 1857, Shklov, Russian Empire — ?) was a nineteenth-century Jewish maskilic mathematician. He wrote mathematical and astronomical articles for various journals, and was the author of Mishpat Emet (1884), a criticism of Lichtenfeld's pamphlets against Slonimski's works. In 1898 he edited a second edition of Slonimski's Yesodei Chokmat ha-Shi'ur on the principles of algebra.
