= Lindenbaum's lemma =

In mathematical logic, Lindenbaum's lemma, named after Adolf Lindenbaum, states that any consistent theory of predicate logic can be extended to a complete consistent theory. The lemma is a special case of the ultrafilter lemma for Boolean algebras, applied to the Lindenbaum algebra of a theory.

== Uses ==
It is used in the proof of Gödel's completeness theorem, among other places.

== Extensions ==
The effective version of the lemma's statement, "every consistent computably enumerable theory can be extended to a complete consistent computably enumerable theory," fails (provided Peano arithmetic is consistent) by Gödel's incompleteness theorem.

== History ==
The lemma was not published by Adolf Lindenbaum; it is originally attributed to him by Alfred Tarski.
