= Joseph of Spain =

Joseph of Spain was a Jewish mathematician of the ninth and tenth centuries CE and may have been a Radhanite. It is unknown if he was the "Joseph of Spain" who authored numerous mathematical treatises in use in Europe in medieval times.

Abraham ibn Daud and other sources credit Joseph with bringing the so-called "Arabic numerals" from India to Europe.
