= Solomon Davin of Rodez =

- שלמה דוין דרודיש
- Occupations: Astronomer and translator
- Years active: Mid-to-late 14th century
- Employer: Immanuel Bonfils

Solomon Davin of Rodez (Hebrew: שלמה דוין דרודיש, romanized: Shlomo Davin de-Rodish) was a Jewish astronomer who lived in the second half of the fourteenth century. He was a disciple of Immanuel Bonfils in Orange.

He translated from Latin into Hebrew, under the title Sefer mishpete ha-kokhavim, Abu al-Ḥasan Ali ibn Abi Rijal's astronomical and astrological work Kitab al-bari' fi ahkam an-nujum ('The Brilliant Book on the Judgments of the Stars'). Davin's translation, attested in three manuscripts, is accompanied by glosses, which begin with the abbreviated form of his name—אשד״ת המעתיק (אמר שלמה דוין תלמיד, 'And said Solomon Davin, the disciple, the translator'). Davin also translated the astronomical tables of Paris.
