= Kirszbraun theorem =

Mathematical theorem related to real and functional analysis

In mathematics, specifically real analysis and functional analysis, the Kirszbraun theorem states that if U is a subset of some Hilbert space H_{1}, and H_{2} is another Hilbert space, and

$$f: U \rightarrow H_2$$

is a Lipschitz-continuous map, then there is a Lipschitz-continuous map

$$F: H_1 \rightarrow H_2$$

that extends f and has the same Lipschitz constant as f.

Note that this result in particular applies when $H_1$ and $H_2$ are Euclidean spaces, and it was in this form that Kirszbraun originally formulated and proved the theorem. The version for Hilbert spaces can for example be found in (Schwartz 1969, p. 21). If H_{1} is a separable space (in particular, if it is a Euclidean space) the result is true in Zermelo–Fraenkel set theory; for the fully general case, it appears to need some form of the axiom of choice; the Boolean prime ideal theorem is known to be sufficient.

The proof of the theorem uses geometric features of Hilbert spaces; the corresponding statement for Banach spaces is not true in general, not even for finite-dimensional Banach spaces. It is for instance possible to construct counterexamples where the domain is a subset of $\mathbb{R}^n$ with the maximum norm and $\mathbb{R}^m$ carries the Euclidean norm. More generally, the theorem fails for $\mathbb{R}^m$ equipped with any $\ell_p$ norm ($p \neq 2$) (Schwartz 1969, p. 20).

== Explicit formulas ==
For an $\mathbb{R}$-valued function the extension is provided by
$$\tilde f(x):=\inf_{u\in U}\big(f(u)+\text{Lip}(f)\cdot d(x,u)\big),$$
where $\text{Lip}(f)$ is the Lipschitz constant of $f$ on U.

In general, an extension can also be written for $\mathbb{R}^{m}$-valued functions as
$$\tilde f(x):= \nabla_{y}(\textrm{conv}(g(x,y))(x,0),$$
where
$$g(x,y):=\inf_{u\in U}\left\{\langle f(u),y \rangle +\frac{\text{Lip}(f)}{2}\|x-u\|^{2}\right\}+\frac{\text{Lip}(f)}{2}
\|x\|^{2}+\text{Lip}(f)\|y\|^{2}$$
and conv(g) is the lower convex envelope of g.

== History ==
The theorem was proved by Mojżesz David Kirszbraun (1934), and later it was reproved by Frederick Valentine (1945), who first proved it for the Euclidean plane. Sometimes this theorem is also called Kirszbraun–Valentine theorem. An explicit formula for Lipschitz extension was given by E. J. McShane in 1934.
