= Mojżesz David Kirszbraun =

Polish mathematician (1903–1942)

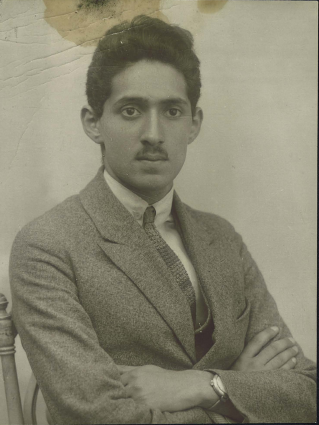
- Born: August 13, 1903; Warsaw
- Died: 1942 (aged 38–39); Warsaw Ghetto
- Education: University of Warsaw
- Occupation: Mathematician

Mojżesz David Kirszbraun (1903–1942) was a Polish mathematician, mostly known for the Kirszbraun theorem on extensions of Lipschitz maps. This theorem appears in his master's thesis, defended in Warsaw in 1930.

Kirszbraun finished school in 1922. Together with his classmate Adolf Lindenbaum, he continued his studies in Warsaw University. Later, he worked as an actuary in an insurance company. He died in a ghetto in 1942.

== Publications ==
- Kirzbraun, M.D. (1934). "Ueber die zusammenziehende und Lipschitzsche Transformationen". Fund. Math. 22: 77–108. doi:10.4064/fm-22-1-77-108.
