= Camille-Christophe Gerono =

French mathematician

- Born: 1799; Paris, France
- Died: 1891; Paris, France
- Scientific career
- Fields: Mathematics

Camille-Christophe Gerono (1799 in Paris, France – 1891 in Paris) was a French mathematician. He concerned himself above all with geometry. The Lemniscate of Gerono or figure-eight curve was named after him. With Olry Terquem, he was founding co-editor in 1842 of the scientific journal Nouvelles Annales de Mathématiques.
