= Yudell Luke =

American mathematician

- Born: 26 June 1918; Kansas City, Missouri, United States
- Died: 6 May 1983; Moscow, Russia
- Known for: Special functions Hypergeometric functions
- Awards: N T Veatch award for Distinguished Research and Creative Activity
- Scientific career
- Fields: Mathematics
- Workplaces: University of Missouri

Yudell Leo Luke (26 June 1918 – 6 May 1983) was an American mathematician who made significant contributions to MRIGlobal, was awarded the N. T. Veatch award for Distinguished Research and Creative Activity in 1975, and appointed as Curator's Professor at the University of Missouri in 1978, a post he held until his death.

Luke published eight books and nearly 100 papers in a wide variety of mathematical areas, ranging from aeronautics to approximation theory. By his own estimation, Luke reviewed over 1,800 papers and books throughout his career.

== Biography ==
Yudell Luke was born in Kansas City, Missouri, U.S. on 26 June 1918 to Jewish parents. His father, David Luke, was sexton of Congregation Kerem Israel Beth Shalom. The young Luke attended the Kansas City Missouri Junior College, graduating in 1937. He read mathematics at the University of Illinois, receiving a Bachelor's degree in 1939, and a Master's the following year. He then taught at the university for two years, but was called up for World War II military service in 1942.

Luke served in the United States Navy until 1946 and was stationed in Hawaii for the duration of the war. After his service, he returned to the university, where he met his future wife LaVerne (LaVerne B. (née Podolsky), 1922–2004) at the University of Illinois. They moved to Kansas City in 1946 and had four daughters, Molly, Janis, Linda, and Debra, and established the Yudell and LaVerne Luke Senior Adult Transportation Fund at the Kansas City Jewish Community Center.

Soon after Luke moved to Kansas City, he was appointed to MRIGlobal (formerly Midwest Research Institute). His first position was as Head of the Mathematical Analysis Section, a position he held until his promotion to Senior Advisor for Mathematics in 1961. Luke also held posts at other universities. In 1955, he became a lecturer at the University of Missouri–Kansas City, and he also taught at the University of Kansas. After the mathematics group of MRIGlobal was disbanded in 1971, Luke was appointed professor at the University of Missouri, and in 1975, received the N. T. Veatch award for Distinguished Research and Creative Activity. He then became Curator's Professor at Missouri in 1978.

In 1982, an exchange programme between the University of Missouri and the University of Moscow was formed, and the following year, Luke travelled to Moscow to lecture on topics including special functions, asymptotic analysis, and approximation theory. He died while in Russia on 6 May 1983.

Luke had a wide range of interests outside mathematics, including basketball, baseball, bridge, and cribbage. He wrote two books on the probabilities of winning at the latter. He also expressed interest in opera and philosophy, and once gave a series of lectures on the history of philosophy, mainly focusing on Baruch Spinoza.

== Selected bibliography ==
=== Papers ===
- "Rational approximations to the exponential function". Journal of the ACM, 4(1):24–29, January 1957.

=== Books ===
- "Integrals of Bessel functions". MacGraw-Hill. 1962
- "The Special Functions and Their Approximations: v. 1 (Mathematics in Science & Engineering)". Academic Press Inc. April 1969. ISBN 978-0-12-459901-7
- "The Special Functions and Their Approximations: v. 2 (Mathematics in Science & Engineering)". Academic Press Inc. 1969.
- "Cumulative Index to Mathematics of Computation 1943–1969". American Mathematical Society. December 1972. ISBN 978-0-8218-4000-9
- "Algorithms for the Computation of Mathematical Functions". Academic Press Inc. 1977. ISBN 978-0-12-459940-6
