= Simon Motot =

Jewish-Italian mathematician

Simon ben Moses ben Simon Motot (Hebrew: שמעון בן משה בן שמעון מטוט, Shim'on ben Moshe ben Shim'on Moṭoṭ) was a Jewish-Italian mathematician of the fifteenth century who probably lived in Lombardy. His treatise was likely the first Hebrew work giving a detailed treatment of the al-Khwarizmian form of algebra.

== Works ==
Two works by Motot have been preserved. One is a treatise on algebra, entitled "Sefer ha-Alzibra," or "Kelale me-Ḥeshbon ha-Aljibra." In it, Motot claims to have studied several mathematical works written by Christians and to have found among them one containing theorems without demonstrations. This book he chose as his basic work and translated it, supplying the demonstrations from other mathematical sources, and adding some theorems of his own.

The other of Motot's works, entitled Al Yetzirat Shene Kavim She'lo Nifgashu, deals with the problem of the asymptotes. This work consists of two parts, the first being an introduction to the real solution of the problem.
