= Henri Wald =

Romanian philosopher (1920–2002)

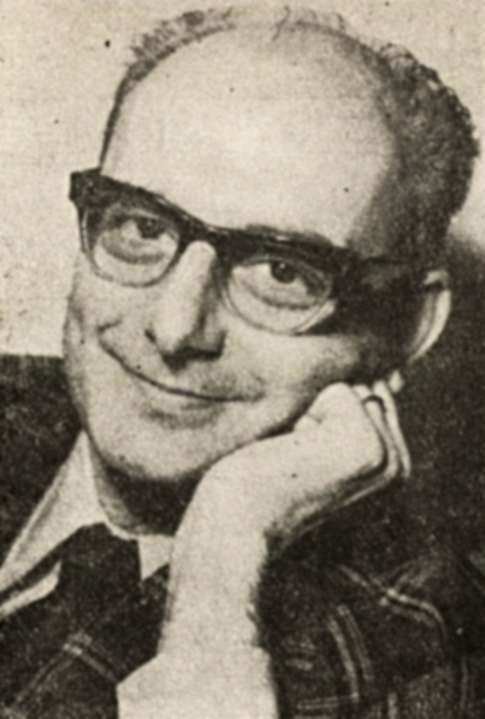
Wald in 1978

Henri "Ricu" Wald (October 31, 1920 – July 14, 2002), also known as Henry Wald, was a Romanian professor, philosopher, logician, and essayist.

== Early life ==
Wald was born to a family of small merchants in Bucharest, the capital of Romania. Wald first became interested in philosophy at age sixteen, during a lecture given by one of his teachers. He was forced to leave high school in 1940 due to discriminatory anti-Jewish laws. Thus, Wald studied at a private college for Jewish students.

== Career ==
During World War II, Wald served in a forced labor detachment due to him being Jewish. In terms of his political views, Wald was a Communist and "a radical antifascist". Wald began publishing in September 1944 in the newspaper Tribuna poporului (The People's Tribune). In addition, he also contributed to several additional leftist periodicals and to some cultural publications as well. Wald graduated from the faculty of philosophy at the University of Bucharest in 1946, after writing a dissertation called “The Petty Bourgeois Mentality.” Wald became a professor of philosophy in Bucharest in 1948, a job which he occupied until 1962 (when he was fired due to his opposition to the official "nationalist-communist" stance of the then-Romanian government). Wald worked in several other educational institutions as well until his retirement in 1983. Due to his political commitments, Wald also worked in the propaganda department for the Communist Romanian regime in the late 1940s and early 1950s. Later on in his life, Wald became significantly closer to Judaism, which he thought was a "matrix of humanist thinking". Late in his life, the Romanian Radio Broadcasting Company’s Center for Oral History (C.O.H.) conducted an interview with Wald where he talked about and discussed his life story. Wald died in 2002, at the age of 80.
