= Abraham Niederländer =

Jewish-Austrian mathematician

Abraham ben Ephraim Niederländer (Hebrew: אַבְרָהָם בֶּן אֶפְרַיִם נידרלנדר), also known as Abraham Sofer and the Sofer of Prague, was a 16th-century Jewish-Austrian mathematician. The sofer of Rabbi Judah Loew ben Bezalel, he also wrote Brit Avraham (1609), a work of Jewish arithmetic based largely on Elijah Mizrachi's Sefer ha-Mispar, as well as general mathematics books.
