= Myrtil Maas =

- Born: 1792; Tomblaine, Meurthe, France
- Died: 27 February 1865 (aged 72–73); Paris, France
- Education: École normale supérieure

Myrtil Maas (1792 – 27 February 1865) was a French mathematician, actuary, and Jewish community leader.

== Biography ==
Myrtil Maas was born in 1792 to a Jewish family in Tomblaine, Meurthe. A student at the Lycée Charlemagne, he was admitted in 1813 to both the École polytechnique and the École normale in Paris, choosing the latter. He studied at the École normale until the political upheaval of 1815 caused the suspension of the school. In that year, when walking with some of his schoolfellows in the Champ de Mars, where the troops were drilling, he was accidentally shot in the leg, and the wound never perfectly healed.

Being a Jew, he was unable to obtain a chair in mathematics; but he found employment first in a porcelain factory and then as a private tutor. In 1818 he was employed as actuary by the newly formed Compagnie générale des assurances sur la vie et contre l'incendie, a Paris insurance company. He joined Olinde Rodrigues to form a committee to watch over and control the operations of the company, and the principles they established for insurance tariffs were soon adopted by all the leading French life insurance companies. Together, they produced the actuarial tables that would be used by all French insurance companies throughout the century, which were eventually published in 1860 and had seven editions until 1933.

Maas laboured actively in the interests of the Jews, and played a leading role in the Consistoire central israélite in the 1830s and 1840s, serving as its vice-president from 1843. He died on 27 February 1865 from a malady that developed from his wound.
