= Moses Zuriel =

Jewish mathematician

Moses ben Samuel Zuriel (Hebrew: מֹשֶׁה בֶּן שְׁמוּאֵל צוּרִיאֵל, Moshe ben Shmu’el Tzuri’el) was a seventeenth-century Jewish mathematician. He was the author of Meḥaddesh Ḥodashim, a calendar for AM 5414–5434.
