= Baruch Solomon Löwenstein =

Mathematician

Baruch Solomon Löwenstein (born in mid-nineteenth century, Włodarka, Russia) was a Jewish mathematician. He wrote Bikkure ha-Limmudiyyot, explanations of mathematical passages in the works of Abraham ibn Ezra, Moses Maimonides, and Joseph Delmedigo. He also annotated and published in 1863 a second edition of Shebile di-Reḳia, by Elias ben Ḥayyim Kohen Höchheimer, on the rules of the calendar, with the elements of geometry, trigonometry, and astronomy.
