= Nissan Deliatitz =

Nissan ben Avraham Deliatitz (Hebrew: ניסן בן אברהם דעליאטיץ) was a 19th-century Russian rabbi and mathematician.

He wrote Keneh Ḥokhmah, a manual of algebra in five parts, published in Vilna and Grodno in 1829. The work received approbations from Rabbi David, the av beit din of Novhardok, and Rabbi Avraham Abele ben Avraham Shlomo Poswoler, an eminent scholar who headed the Vilna beit din.
