= Abraham Eberlen =

Jewish-German mathematician

Abraham ben Judah Eberlen (Hebrew: אַבְרָהָם בֶּן יְהוּדָה עֵבֶּרלִין) was a sixteenth-century Jewish-German mathematician living in Frankfurt am Main. He was the author of Sefer ha-Ẓifar, a work containing mathematical problems with solutions, which was finished in February 1537.
