= Harriet Pollatsek =

American mathematician

Harriet Suzanne Katcher Pollatsek (born Harriet Katcher, May 2, 1942) is an American mathematician and Professor Emeritus of Mathematics at Mount Holyoke College.

== Education and career ==
Born to a Jewish family in Detroit, Michigan, Pollatsek entered the honors program at University of Michigan in 1959, the first person in her family to attend college. She earned a BA in mathematics in 1963 and her PhD in 1967 under the direction of Jack E. McLaughlin. After graduating she held short-term teaching positions at Western Michigan University in Kalamazoo, the University of Toledo, and the University of Massachusetts Amherst.

Following this, she joined the faculty at Mount Holyoke College in 1970, and earned tenure there in 1974. In 1990 she was named the Julia and Sarah Ann Adams Professor of Science at Mount Holyoke College. She was dean of studies from 1977 to 1980. On sabbatical leaves, she has also been a visiting professor at the University of Oregon.

== Contributions and honors ==
Pollatsek's research interests include finite groups, finite geometries, Lie theory, difference sets and their application to error correcting codes and coding theory.

With Emily H. Moore, she is the author of the book Difference Sets: Connecting Algebra, Combinatorics, and Geometry (Student Mathematical Library 67, American Mathematical Society, 2013).

She has been active in developing new methods of teaching mathematics, particularly in developing a new method of teaching calculus called calculus in context. This method embeds calculus concepts in specific questions from various sciences and then goes to the abstract and generalized concepts.

She has worked on summer mathematical research with undergraduates under the NSF program Research Experiences for Undergraduates.

In 2007 Pollatsek was presented with the Mount Holyoke College Faculty Prize for Teaching.
