= Joseph Parsi =

Jewish mathematician

Joseph Parsi (fl. late 15th century) was a Jewish mathematician. All that is known of him is that he was the author of an unpublished work entitled Keli Faz, a manual showing how to construct mathematical instruments. Steinschneider argues that Parsi may be identical with Joseph the physician, cosmographer, and astronomer of Lisbon, who in 1480 advised King John of Portugal to employ the astrolabe at sea, and who was a member of the commission to which the project of Columbus was submitted for examination. The name "Parsi", however, indicates that the author of the Keli Faz was a Persian.
