= Sigmund Gundelfinger =

German mathematician

Sigmund Gundelfinger (14 February 1846 in Kirchberg an der Jagst – 13 December 1910 in Darmstadt) was a German-Jewish mathematician who introduced the Gundelfinger quartic and proved the completeness of the invariants of a ternary cubic.

== Gundelfinger quartic ==
In mathematics, the Gundelfinger quartic is a quartic surface in projective space studied by Gundelfinger (1875).

== Selected works ==
- Gundelfinger, Sigmund (1895). Dingeldey, Friedrich (ed.). Vorlesungen aus der Analytischen Geometrie der Kegelschnitte. Leipzig: Teubner.
