= Elias Höchheimer =

18th century Jewish astronomer and mathematician

Elias ben Ḥayyim Cohen Höchheimer (or Hechim) was an eighteenth century Jewish astronomer and mathematician.

Born in Hochheim, Höchheimer lived a long time in Hildburghausen and died in Amsterdam. He was the author of Shebile di-Reḳi'a (Prague, 1784), on trigonometry and astronomy, Sefer Yalde ha-Zeman (Prague, 1786), a commentary on Jedaiah Bedersi's Beḥinat ha-'Olam, and two German-language textbooks on arithmetic.
