= Bashar ibn Shu'aib =

Bashar (or Bishr) ben Phinehas ibn Shu'aib was a tenth century Jewish mathematician.

According to Hottinger (Promptuarium, p. 96), the Arabic works of Ibn Shu'aib are often quoted by Arabic writers. In 997, Abu 'Ali 'Isa ibn Zara'ah addressed to Ibn Shu'aib a pamphlet against Judaism which seemed to be an answer to a pro-Jewish work by Ibn Shu'aib (see Ibn Abi Uṣaibi'a, Uyun al-Anba, ii. 236).
