= Nouvelles Annales de Mathématiques =

- Discipline: Mathematics
- Language: French

Publication details
- History: 1842–1927
- Publisher: Bachelier (France)

Standard abbreviations
- ISO 4: Nouv. Ann. Math.

Indexing
- LCCN: 25005131
- OCLC no.: 643505664

Links
- Journal archive at NUMDAM

The Nouvelles Annales de Mathématiques (subtitled Journal des candidats aux écoles polytechnique et normale) was a French scientific journal in mathematics. It was established in 1842 by Olry Terquem and Camille-Christophe Gerono, and continued publication until 1927, with later editors including Charles-Ange Laisant and Raoul Bricard. Initially published by Carilian-Goeury, it was taken over after several years by a different publisher, Bachelier.

Although competing in subject matter with Joseph Liouville's Journal de Mathématiques Pures et Appliquées (with which Terquem had previously been associated), and initially published by a different publisher than Liouville's journal, the editors of the Nouvelles Annales cooperated with Liouville in directing papers between the two journals. As well as publishing new results in mathematics, the Nouvelles Annales included pedagogical material, and extracts from papers published in other journals.
