= Janina Hosiasson-Lindenbaum =

Polish logician and philosopher

- Born: Janina Hosiasson; December 6, 1899; Warsaw, Vistula Land
- Died: 1942 (aged 42–43); Wilna, Reichskommissariat Ostland
- Cause of death: Execution
- Education: University of Warsaw
- Known for: Raven paradox
- Spouse: Adolf Lindenbaum
- Scientific career
- Fields: Logic, mathematics
- Workplaces: University of Warsaw
- Thesis: Justification of Inductive Reasoning (1926)
- Doctoral advisor: Tadeusz Kotarbiński

Signature
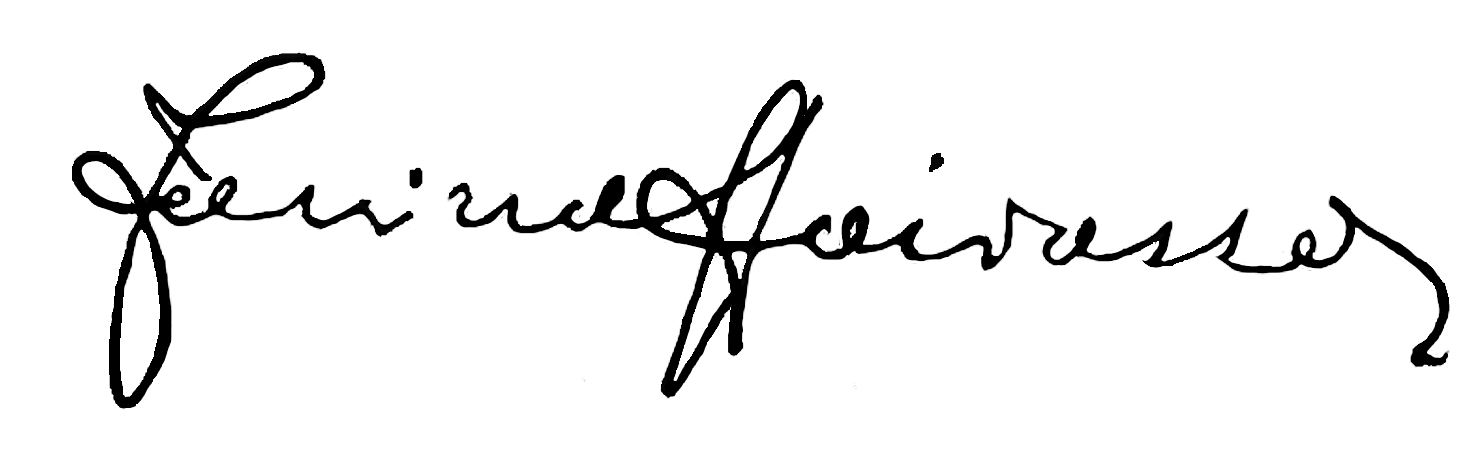

Janina Hosiasson-Lindenbaum (December 5, 1899—April 1942) was a Polish logician and philosopher. She published some twenty research papers along with translations into Polish of three books by Bertrand Russell. The main focus of her writings was on foundational problems related to probability, induction and confirmation. She is noted especially for authoring the first printed discussion of the Raven Paradox which she credits to Carl Hempel and the probabilistic solution she outlined to it. Shot by the Gestapo in 1942, she, like her husband Adolf Lindenbaum, and many other eminent representatives of Polish logic, shared the fate of millions of Jews murdered on Polish soil by the Nazis.

== Biography ==
Janina Hosiasson was born on 6 December 1899 in Warsaw, the daughter of the merchant Josef Hosiasson and his wife Sophia Feigenblat.

She was a student of Tadeusz Kotarbinski and Jan Łukasiewicz at the University of Warsaw and received her doctorate there under Kotarbinski in 1926 with a dissertation on the "Justification of Inductive Reasoning". She would then combine her continuing research with employment as a teacher of philosophy in a secondary school. By the late 1920s she was a respected philosopher of logic of the Lwów–Warsaw school who actively participated in the second Polish Philosophical Congress held in Warsaw in September 1927 and (like her husband-to-be) delivered papers at the First Congress of Mathematicians from Slavic Countries held in Warsaw and Poznań in September 1929. Janina then went, on a scholarship from the Polish Ministry of Religious Affairs and Public Education, to spend the 1929/30 academic year studying philosophy in Cambridge.

In 1935, Hosiasson became the first woman to have work published in the journal Erkenntnis. She was one of the speakers at the first Unity of Science Congress in Paris 1935. She is also known to have participated in the preliminary meeting for the same in Prague the previous year. On December 18, 1935, Janina Hosiasson married mathematician and logician Adolf Lindenbaum in Wąbrzeźno, Pomerania. (The marriage certificate is located in the National Archives in Toruń, Poland.). The couple would then reside together in the Zoliborz district of Warsaw. After marriage Janina would use the surname Hosiasson-Lindenbaum. She attended the second Unity of Science Congress held in Copenhagen in 1936 and had also (like Alfred Tarski) been scheduled to present her research at the fifth Unity of Science Congress at Harvard in September 1939. Fatefully, however, she was unable to sail in time—she applied for passage on the next boat to America after that taken by Tarski but her visa was denied.

On 1 September, Germany invaded Poland. On 6 September 1939, with Warsaw under artillery fire, the couple fled the city on foot. As Janina would report in letters to Otto Neurath and G.E. Moore, their progress east was slow and the road repeatedly strafed by the Luftwaffe. The couple became separated after Janina accepted a lift on a motorcycle to Rivne. From there, she made her way to Vilnius where she eventually learnt her husband had taken refuge in Bialystok. Soviet forces entered Poland on 17 September and both cities would fall under Russian occupation within the same month. Janina later met her husband in Bialystok but, disagreeing about where best to survive, he chose to remain there whilst she returned to Vilnius (a city under Polish jurisdiction at the outbreak of war but which the occupying Soviets formally returned to a then notionally independent Lithuania).

On 22 June 22, 1941, Germany invaded (the Polish territories annexed by) the Soviet Union and within days, their troops had entered Bialystok and, soon after, Vilnius. At some point before July 1941 Adolf Lindenbaum moved to Vilnius, staying in a small satellite community in the east of the city. At some point before the middle of August 1941, Adolf, along with his sister Stefanja, would be arrested and then, in nearby Naujoji Vilnia, shot by German forces or their Lithuanian collaborators.

Hosiasson was arrested soon after the Nazis took over Vilnius and, from October 1941, was held in Lukiškės Prison. Marta Sznajder suggests she was likely shot on 29 March 1942.

== Select works ==
- "On Confirmation", Journal of Symbolic Logic, Vol. 5, No. 4 (Dec., 1940), pp. 133–148.
- "Why do we prefer probabilities relative to many data?" Mind, Volume XL, Issue 157, (Jan, 1931), pp. 23–36
- "Induction et Analogie: Comparison de leur fondement", Mind, Vol L, Issue 200, (Oct, 1941), pp. 351–365
- "Theoretical Aspects of the Advancement of Knowledge", Synthese, Vol. 7, No. 4/5 (1948/49), pp. 253–261.

A complete listing of Hosiasson's published works has been made available by Marta Sznajder.
