= Marion Cohen =

American poet

Marion Cohen (born 1943) is an American poet whose pen name is Marion Deutsche Cohen. She is also a mathematician with a Ph.D. in distribution theory from Wesleyan University.

== Biography ==
Cohen has published 32 books of poetry and prose. She writes poetry and creative non-fiction, in particular memoir and has written about pregnancy loss, spousal illness/caregiving, and her passion for mathematics. She has studied the relationship between art and mathematics, and has taught math and writing at Arcadia University in Glenside, PA.

Cohen has studied the relationship between art and mathematics and has developed a course called Truth and Beauty: Mathematics in Literature.

== Selected works ==
- "What I'm Wearing Today" (dancing girl press, 2016
- "Closer to Dying", Word Tech Editions, 2016
- "Truth and Beauty", Word Tech Editions, 2017
- "New Heights in Non-Structure" (dancing girl press, 2018
- "Parables for a Rainy Day", Green Fuse Press, 2013
- "Still the End: Memoir of a Nursing Home Wife", Unlimited Publishing, 2013
- "Sizes Only Slightly Distinct", Green Fuse Press, 2014
- "The Discontinuity at the Waistline", Rhythm and Bones Press, 2018
- "The Project of Being Alive", New Plains Press, 2018
- "The Fuss and the Fury", Alien Buddha Press
- "The Essence of Seventh Grade: A King of Autobiography", Alien Buddha Press, 2019
- "Not Erma Bombeck: Diary of a Feminist 70s Mother", Alien Buddha Press, 2020
- "Stress Positions", Alien Buddha Press, 2021
- Cohen, Marion Deutsche, Crossing the Equal Sign. Austin, Tex.: Plain View Press, 2007.
- Cohen, Marion Deutsche, Chronic Progressive. Austin, Tex.: Plain View Press, 2009.
- Cohen, Marion Deutsche, An ambitious sort of grief: a diary of pregnancy & neo-natal loss. Las Colinas [Tex] : Liberal Press, 1986. ISBN 0-934659-03-6 (pbk.)
- Cohen, Marion Deutsche, An ambitious sort of grief: woman, reproduction, and neo-natal loss. Mesquite [Tex.]: Ide House, 1983. ISBN 0-86663-090-2, ISBN 0-86663-091-0 (pbk.)
- Cohen, Marion Deutsche, Dirty details: the days and nights of a well spouse. Philadelphia: Temple University Press, 1996. ISBN 1-56639-425-2 (cloth), ISBN 1-56639-426-0 (pbk. )
- Cohen, Marion Deutsche, A flower garden : all about it: the diary of a woman’s thoughts after cesarean birth. Las Colinas: Liberal Press, 1987. ISBN 0-934659-05-2 (pbk.)
- Cohen, Marion Deutsche, The shadow of an angel: a diary of a subsequent pregnancy following neo-natal loss. Las Colinas [Tex.]: Liberal Press, 1986. ISBN 0-934659-04-4 (pbk.)
- Cohen, Marion Deutsche, She was born, she died : a collection of poems following the death of an infant. Rev. ed. with new poems. Omaha, Neb.: Centering Corporation, 1996. ISBN 1-56123-044-8
- Cohen, Marion Deutsche, The sitting down hug. Las Colinas, Tex.: Liberal Press, 1989. ISBN 0-934659-14-1
- Cohen, Marion Deutsche, Epsilon Country. Center for Thanatology Research, 1995.

=== Editor ===
- Cohen, Marion Deutsche, ed., The Limits of miracles: poems about the loss of babies. South Hadley, Mass.: Bergin & Garvey Pub., 1985. ISBN 0-89789-058-2 (pb), ISBN 0-89789-066-3
- Cohen, Marion, & Wemara, eds., Tuesday nights: writings by women. Philadelphia: Tuesday Nights, 1977.
