= Moses Ensheim =

Moses Ensheim (1750–9 April 1839), also known as Brisac and Moses Metz, was a French-Jewish mathematician and Hebrew poet.

== Biography ==
Destined for the rabbinate by his parents, Ensheim left his native Metz against his father's will, and for many years led a wandering life. From 1782 to 1785 he was tutor in the family of Moses Mendelssohn in Berlin, having special charge over the education of Abraham Mendelssohn. On leaving Mendelssohn's house he returned to Metz, where he struggled hard to make a living by teaching mathematics. Being a Jew, he was rejected for the position of professor of mathematics at the newly founded École centrale de Metz.

Ensheim was a prominent member of the movement instituted by the Me'assefim. In 178, he published a volume of Hebrew riddles. In 1790, Ensheim published Shalosh Ḥidot, a satire against billiards card card games, and two hymns: Al-ha-Va'ad ha-Gadol asher bi-medinat Ẓarefat, addressed to the National Assembly in Versailles, and the triumphal song La-Menaẓe'aḥ Shir, which was sung in 1793 in the synagogue at Metz to the tune of La Marseillaise.

He was an intimate friend of Abbé Grégoire, and helped him with the preparation of his 1788 essay in defense of the Jews. His Recherches sur les calculs différentiels et intégrals (1799) was highly praised by Lagrange and Laplace, with whom he was personally associated.

His last years were passed at Bayonne as a tutor in the home of Abraham Furtado, his leisure being devoted to Talmudical studies. Before his death in 1839 he gave 12,000 francs, one-fourth of his fortune, to the Jewish elementary school of Metz.
