= Olry Terquem =

French mathematician (1782–1862)

- Born: 16 June 1782 Metz, France
- Died: 6 May 1862 (aged 79) Paris, France
- Occupation: mathematician, geometry

Olry Terquem (16 June 1782 – 6 May 1862) was a French mathematician. He is known for his works in geometry and for founding two scientific journals, one of which was the first journal about the history of mathematics. He was also the pseudonymous author (as Tsarphati) of a sequence of letters advocating radical reform in Judaism. He was French Jewish.

== Education and career ==
Terquem grew up speaking Yiddish, and studying only the Hebrew language and the Talmud. However, after the French Revolution his family came into contact with a wider society, and his studies broadened. Despite his poor French he was admitted to study mathematics at the École Polytechnique in Paris, beginning in 1801, as only the second Jew to study there. He became an assistant there in 1803, and earned his doctorate in 1804.

After finishing his studies he moved to Mainz (at that time known as Mayence and part of imperial France), where he taught at the Imperial Lycée. In 1811 he moved to the artillery school in the same city, in 1814 he moved again to the artillery school in Grenoble, and in 1815 he became the librarian of the Dépôt Central de l'Artillerie in Paris, where he remained for the rest of his life. He became an officer of the Legion of Honor in 1852. After he died, his funeral was officiated by Lazare Isidor, the Chief Rabbi of Paris and later of France, and attended by over 12 generals headed by Edmond Le Bœuf.

== Mathematics ==
Terquem translated works concerning artillery, was the author of several textbooks, and became an expert on the history of mathematics. Terquem and Camille-Christophe Gerono were the founding editors of the Nouvelles Annales de Mathématiques in 1842. Terquem also founded another journal in 1855, the Bulletin de Bibliographie, d'Histoire et de Biographie de Mathématiques, which was published as a supplement to the Nouvelles Annales, and he continued editing it until 1861. This was the first journal dedicated to the history of mathematics.

The nine-point circle of a triangle. The three marked points that lie on the circle and interior to the triangle are the ones found by Terquem. The point of convergence of the three red lines through the triangle is its orthocenter.

In geometry, Terquem is known for naming the nine-point circle and fully proving its properties. This is a circle that passes through nine special points of any given triangle. Karl Wilhelm Feuerbach had previously observed that the three feet of the altitudes of a triangle and the three midpoints of its sides all lie on a single circle, but Terquem was the first to prove that this circle also contains the midpoints of the line segments connecting each vertex to the orthocenter of the triangle. He also gave a new proof of Feuerbach's theorem that the nine-point circle is tangent to the incircle and excircles of a triangle.

Terquem's other contributions to mathematics include naming the pedal curve of another curve, and counting the number of perpendicular lines from a point to an algebraic curve as a function of the degree of the curve. He was also the first to observe that the minimum or maximum value of a symmetric function is often obtained by setting all variables equal to each other.

== Jewish activism ==
Terquem has been called the first, most radical, and most outspoken of the major proponents of Jewish reform in France, "the enfant terrible of French Judaism". He published 27 "letters of an Israelite" under the name "Tsarphati" (a Hebrew word for a Frenchman), pushing for reforms that in his view would better assimilate Jews into modern life and better accommodate working-class Jews. The first nine of these appeared in L'Israélite Français, and the remaining 18 as letters to the editor in Courrier de la Moselle. Terquem rejected the Talmud, proposed to codify intermarriage between Jews and non-Jews, pushed to move the sabbath to Sunday, advocated using other languages than Hebrew for prayers, and fought against circumcision, regressive attitudes towards women, and the Jewish calendar. However, he had little effect on the Jewish practices of the time.

Despite Terquem's calls for reform, and despite having married a Catholic woman and raised his children as Catholic, he requested that his funeral be held with all the proper Jewish rites.
