= Immanuel Bonfils =

Israeli mathematician and astronomer

Immanuel ben Jacob Bonfils (c. 1300 – 1377) was a French-Jewish mathematician and astronomer in medieval times who flourished from 1340 to 1377, a rabbi who was a pioneer of exponential calculus and is credited with inventing the system of decimal fractions. He taught astronomy and mathematics in Orange and later lived in Tarascon, both towns in the Holy Roman Empire that are now part of modern-day France. Bonfils studied the works of Gersonides (Levi ben Gershom), the father of modern trigonometry, and Al-Battani and even taught at the academy founded by Gersonides in Orange.

Bonfils preceded any attempt at a European decimal system by 150 years, publishing the treatise Method of Division by Rabbi Immanuel and Other Topics (Hebrew: דרך חילוק) on the general theory of decimal fractions around 1350. This was a forerunner to Simon Stevin, the first to widely distribute publications on this topic, and employed decimal notation for integers, fractions, and both positive and negative exponents.

While living in Tarascon in 1365, Bonfils published the work for which he would become best known, Sepher Shesh Kenaphayim (Book of Six Wings) (Hebrew: שש כנפים), a manuscript on eclipses that featured astronomical tables predicting future solar and lunar positions (divided into six parts). The book included data for every important date on the Jewish calendar and even correction factors necessary for those who lived as far away as Constantinople. Breaking the tables into six parts was an allusion to the six wings of the seraphim as mentioned in the Bible in Isaiah 6:2, earning Bonfils the nickname master of the wings.

For 300 years, Bonfils' calculations which were extensively used by sailors and explorers well into the 17th century. The book was translated from Hebrew into Latin in 1406 by Johannes Lucae e Camerino and into Greek in 1435 by Michael Chrysokokkes. The book inspired Chemist George Sarton to publish his own version of Six Wings nearly 600 years later. Bonfils translated a number of books from Latin to Hebrew. He also wrote a treatise on the relationship between the diameter and circumference of a circle and methods of calculating square roots.

== Works ==
- Bonfils, Immanuel (1365), The Wings of Eagles, Hebrew: שש כנפים, in six books. Other name: Book of Six Wings, Hebrew: שש כנפים. The main astronomical work of Bonfils.
- Bonfils, Immanuel (c. 1350), The Invention of the Decimal Fractions and the Application of the Exponential Calculus by Immanuel Bonfils of Tarascon
- Bonfils, Immanuel (c. 1350), Method of Division by Rabbi Immanuel and Other Topics, Hebrew: דרך חילוק, a course of decimal arithmetics, including decimal fractions.
