= Adolf Lindenbaum =

Polish mathematician and logician (1904–1941)

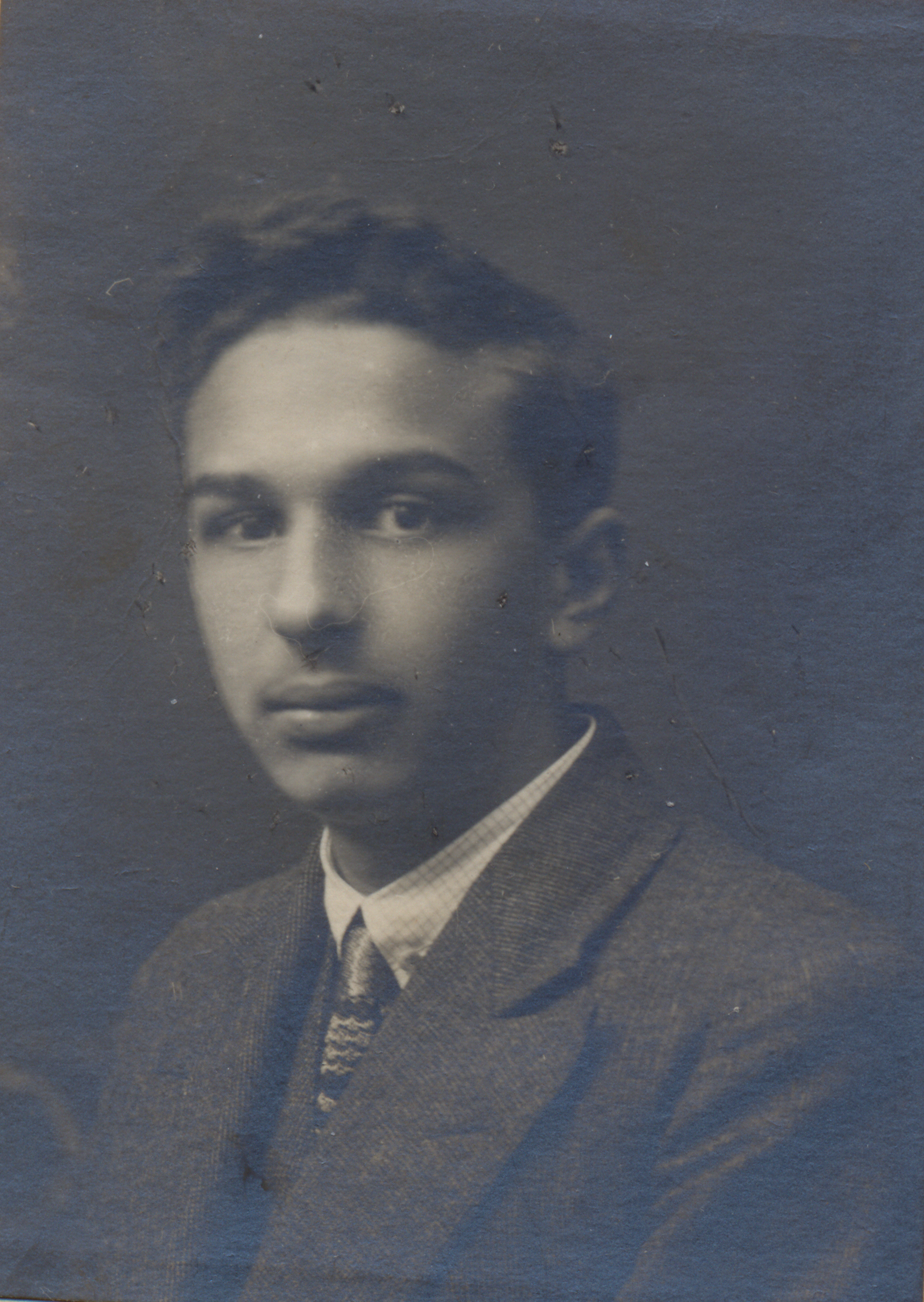
- c. 1922
- Born: June 12, 1904; Warsaw, Poland
- Died: August 1941 (aged 37); Naujoji Vilnia, Lithuania
- Education: University of Warsaw
- Known for: Lindenbaum–Tarski algebra, Lindenbaum's lemma
- Spouse: Janina Hosiasson-Lindenbaum
- Scientific career
- Fields: Logic, mathematics
- Workplaces: University of Warsaw
- Thesis: On metric properties of point sets (1928)
- Doctoral advisor: Wacław Sierpiński

Adolf Lindenbaum (12 June 1904 – August 1941) was a Polish logician and mathematician best known for Lindenbaum's lemma and Lindenbaum–Tarski algebras.

== Life ==
He was born and brought up in Warsaw in a Polish-Jewish family. He earned a Ph.D. in 1928 under Wacław Sierpiński and habilitated at the University of Warsaw in 1934. He published works on mathematical logic, set theory, cardinal and ordinal arithmetic, the axiom of choice, the continuum hypothesis, theory of functions, measure theory, point-set topology, geometry and real analysis. He served as an assistant professor at the University of Warsaw from 1935 until the outbreak of war in September 1939. He was Alfred Tarski's closest collaborator of the inter-war period. Around the end of October or beginning of November 1935 he married Janina Hosiasson, a fellow logician of the Lwow–Warsaw school. He and his wife were adherents of logical empiricism, participated in and contributed to the international unity of science movement, and were members of the original Vienna Circle. Sometime before the middle of August 1941 he and his sister Stefanja were shot to death in Naujoji Vilnia (Nowa Wilejka), 7 km east of Vilnius, by the occupying German forces or Lithuanian collaborators.
