= Moses Botarel Farissol =

Jewish astronomer and mathematician

Moses Botarel Farissol was a Jewish astronomer and mathematician of the second half of the 15th century.

He wrote a work on the calendar entitled Meleket ha-Ḳebi'ah, and compiled, under the title Nofet Ẓufim, calendric tables. Both these works, in manuscript, are preserved in the royal library at Munich.
