= Yehuda Farissol =

Jewish-Italian mathematician and astronomer

Yehuda Farissol (Hebrew: יהודה פריצול; fl. late fifteenth century) was a Jewish-Italian mathematician and astronomer. In 1499 he published a description of the astronomical sphere with diagrams, under the title Iggeret S'fira (Epistle of the Sphere).
