= Gabriel Judah Lichtenfeld =

Polish maskilic mathematician, poet, and author

Gabriel Judah Lichtenfeld (Hebrew: גַּבְרִיאֵל יְהוּדָה ליכטענפעלד; 1811, Lublin — 22 March 1887, Warsaw) was a Jewish-Polish maskilic mathematician, poet, and author. He wrote for Ha-Shachar, Ha-Tzefirah, Izraelita, and Polish newspapers, mostly on mathematical topics.

== Biography ==
A descendant of Moses Isserles, Lichtenfeld showed early ability as a Talmudic scholar. He later became familiar with Latin, German, French, and Polish, and made a special study of philosophy and mathematics.

In the Hebrew periodical Ha-Shachar, there appeared a series of Hebrew articles by Lichtenfeld which attracted attention. His reputation was enhanced by his series of articles, in the Polish periodical Izraelita, on Jewish mathematicians. Lichtenfeld is known also by his polemics with Hayyim Selig Slonimski on mathematical subjects. Among other works, Lichtenfeld was the author of Yedi'ot ha-Shi'urim (1865, "Science of Measurement"), Tzofnat Pa'neach (1874), a critical review of Slonimski's Yesode Ḥokmat ha-Shi'ur, Tosefot (1875), a polemic against Slonimski, Kohen Lelo Elohim (1876), a book of mathematical criticisms, and Sippurim be-Shir ve'Shirim Shonim (1877, "Stories in Verse and Selected Poems"), a collection of poems and rimed prose by himself and by his son-in-law I. L. Peretz. Lichtenfeld's main book on mathematics, Bo'u Ḥeshbon, was published posthumously in 1895.
