= Agmon =

Agmon (Hebrew: אגמון) is a Jewish surname, Hebrew for bulrush. Notable people with the surname include:

- Avraham Agmon (1928–1992), Polish-Israeli diplomat and economist
- David Agmon (born 1947), Israeli general
- Nathan Agmon (1896–1980), Ukrainian-Israeli writer and translator
- Shmuel Agmon (1922–2025), Israeli mathematician
- Yaakov Agmon (1929–2020), Israeli theatre producer
