= Einstein Institute of Mathematics =

Israeli scientific research center

- מכון איינשטיין למתמטיקה
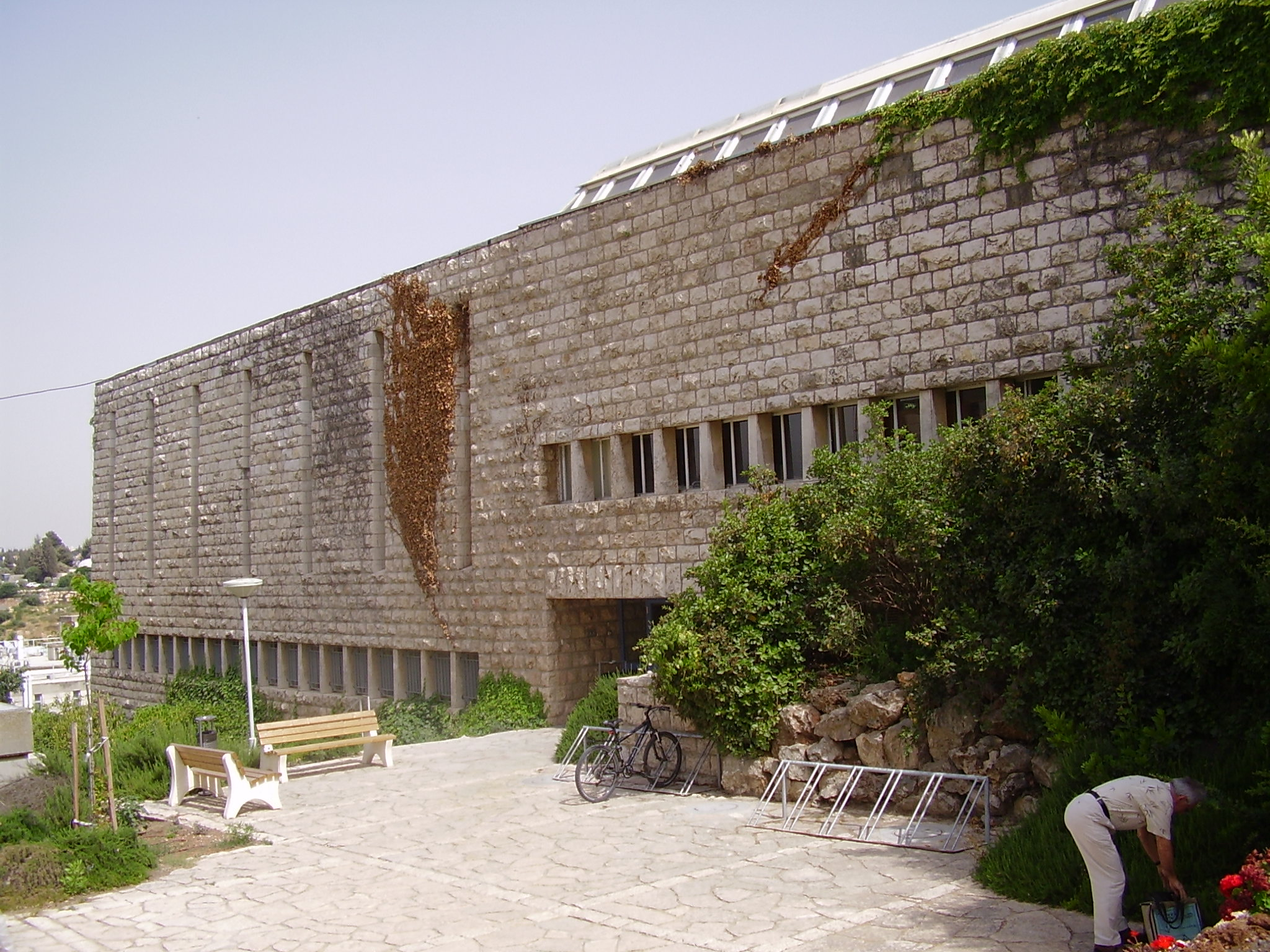
- Manchester Building, Givat Ram
- Former name: Einstein Mathematics-Physics Institute
- Established: April 1, 1925; 101 years ago
- Field of research: Mathematics
- Location: Edmond J. Safra Campus; Givat Ram, Jerusalem, Israel; 9190401; 31.7747°N 35.1980°E
- Operating agency: Hebrew University of Jerusalem
- Website: mathematics.huji.ac.il

The Einstein Institute of Mathematics (Hebrew: מָכוֹן אַייְנְשְׁטַייְן לְמָתֶמָטִיקָה) is a centre for scientific research in mathematics at the Hebrew University of Jerusalem, founded in 1925 with the opening of the university. A leading research institute, the institute's faculty has included recipients of the Nobel Prize, Fields Medal, Wolf Prize, and Israel Prize.

== History ==
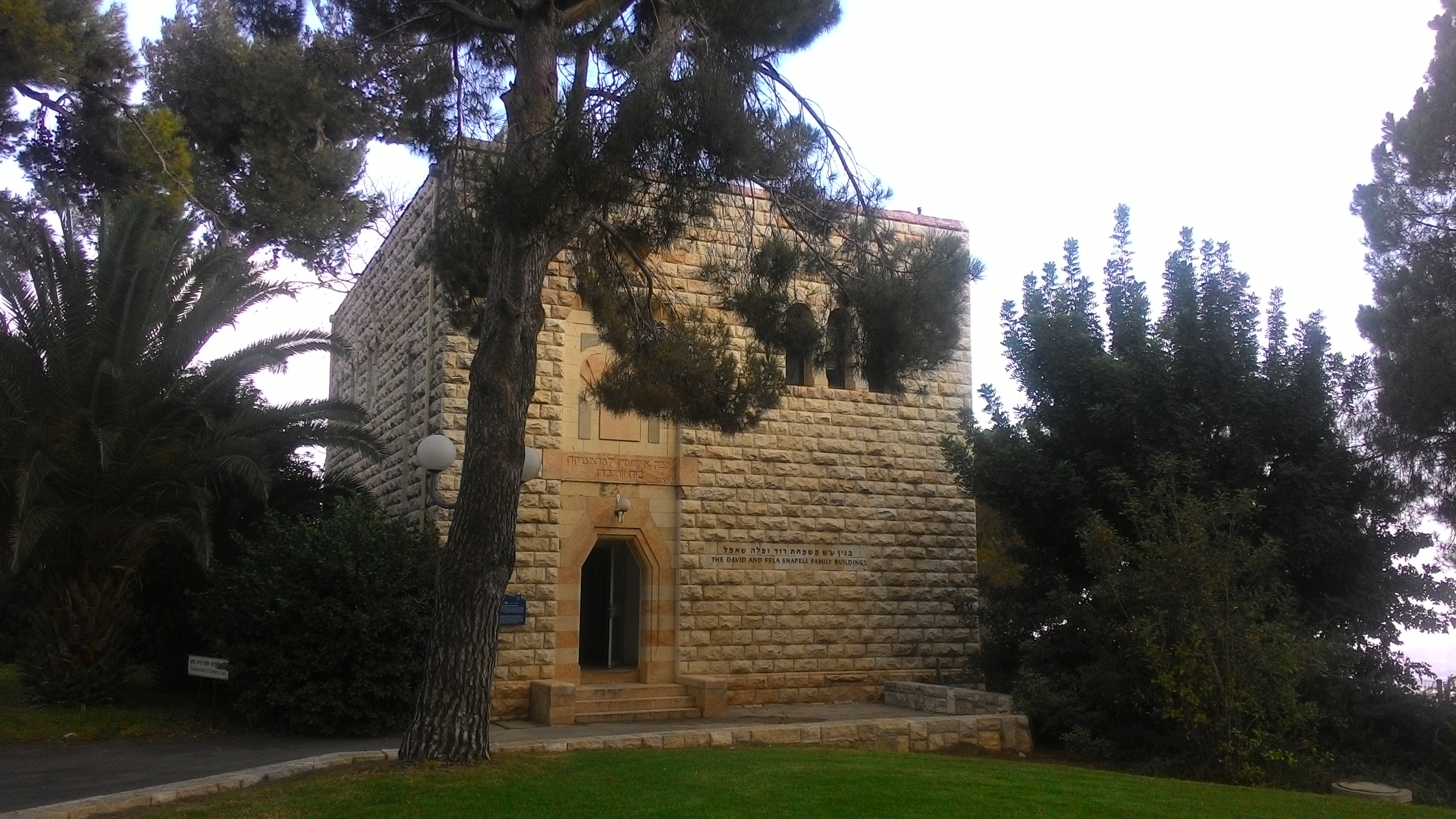
Historic home of the institute on Mount Scopus

About a year before the official inauguration of the Hebrew University, a Jewish-American philanthropist, Philip Wattenberg, endowed the new university with $190,000 (equivalent to $3.5 million in 2025) for a research institute in the name of theoretical physicist Albert Einstein.

The Einstein Mathematics-Physics Institute was established in 1925. Its inaugural lecture was given by Edmund Landau (on problems from number theory), the first lecture in higher mathematics to be delivered in modern Hebrew. The Institute moved to the Philip Wattenburg Building in 1928, (Note: Today part of the Estelle & Eugene Ferkauf Science Teaching Centre.) designed by Benjamin Chaikin and Sir Frank Mears, where it remained until the Hebrew University lost access to Mount Scopus in 1948.

Edmund Landau served as the university's first Professor of Mathematics, and negotiated the transfer of Felix Klein's private library from Göttingen to Jerusalem, which served as the basis for the new mathematical library in Jerusalem. Other early faculty members included Binyamin Amirà, Abraham Fraenkel, and Michael Fekete. A number of researchers arrived at the institute during the rise of the Nazi regime in Germany, such as Issai Schur and Otto Toeplitz.

The Israel Journal of Mathematics was founded at the institute in 1963 as a continuation of the Bulletin of the Research Council of Israel (Section F). A division for computer science was formed within the institute in 1969, which became the independent Institute for Computer Science in 1992. (Note: Now part of the Benin School of Computer Science and Engineering.)

== Notable members ==
=== Current members ===
- Robert Aumann (1930– ); Israel Prize (1994), Nobel Prize (2005)
- Ehud de Shalit (1955– )
- Shaul Foguel (1931– 2020)
- Hillel Furstenberg (1935– ); Israel Prize (1993), Wolf Prize (2006), Abel Prize (2020)
- Sergiu Hart (1949– ); Israel Prize (2018)
- Gil Kalai (1955– )
- Yitzhak Katznelson (1934– ); Steele Prize (2002)
- David Kazhdan (1946– ); Israel Prize (2012)
- Ruth Lawrence (1971– )
- Nati Linial (1953– )
- Azriel Lévy (1934– )
- Elon Lindenstrauss (1970– ); Fields Medal (2010)
- Alexander Lubotzky (1956– ); Israel Prize (2018)
- Menachem Magidor (1946– )
- Abraham Neyman (1949– )
- Eliyahu Rips (1948– ); Erdős Prize (1979)
- Zlil Sela (1962– )
- Aner Shalev (1958– )
- Saharon Shelah (1945– ); Erdős Prize (1977), Pólya Prize (1992), Wolf Prize (2001), Israel Prize (1998), Steele Prize (2013)
- Benjamin Weiss (1941– ); Israel Prize (2026)
- Tamar Ziegler (1971– ); Erdős Prize (2011)

=== Former members ===
- Karim Adiprasito (1988– ); New Horizons Prize, EMS Prize (2019)
- Shmuel Agmon (1922–2025); Israel Prize (1991)
- Binyamin Amirà (1896–1968)
- Shimshon Amitsur (1921–1994), Israel Prize (1953)
- Dror Bar-Natan (1966– )
- Jean Bourgain (1954–2018), Fields Medal (1994), Shaw Prize (2010), Breakthrough Prize (2017)
- Aryeh Dvoretzky (1916–2008); Israel Prize (1973)
- Gregory Eskin (1936– )
- Michael Fekete (1886–1957); Israel Prize (1955)
- Abraham Fraenkel (1891–1965); Israel Prize (1956)
- Ehud Hrushovski (1959– ); Erdős Prize (1994)
- Yael Karshon (1964– )
- Jacob Levitzki (1904–1956); Israel Prize (1953)
- Yoram Lindenstrauss (1936–2012); Israel Prize (1981)
- Moshé Machover (1936– )
- Michael Maschler (1927–2008)
- Amnon Pazy (1936–2006), mathematician; president of the Hebrew University of Jerusalem
- Michael Rabin (1931– ); Turing Award (1976), Israel Prize (1995)
- Yuval Peres (1963– ); Loève Prize (2001)
- Esther Seiden (1908–2014)
