= Lindenstrauss =

Lindenstrauss is a surname. Notable people with the surname include:

- Joram Lindenstrauss, Israeli mathematician
- Micha Lindenstrauss, Israeli judge
- Elon Lindenstrauss, Israeli mathematician
