= Isabella Novik =

Israeli mathematician

- איזבלה נוביק
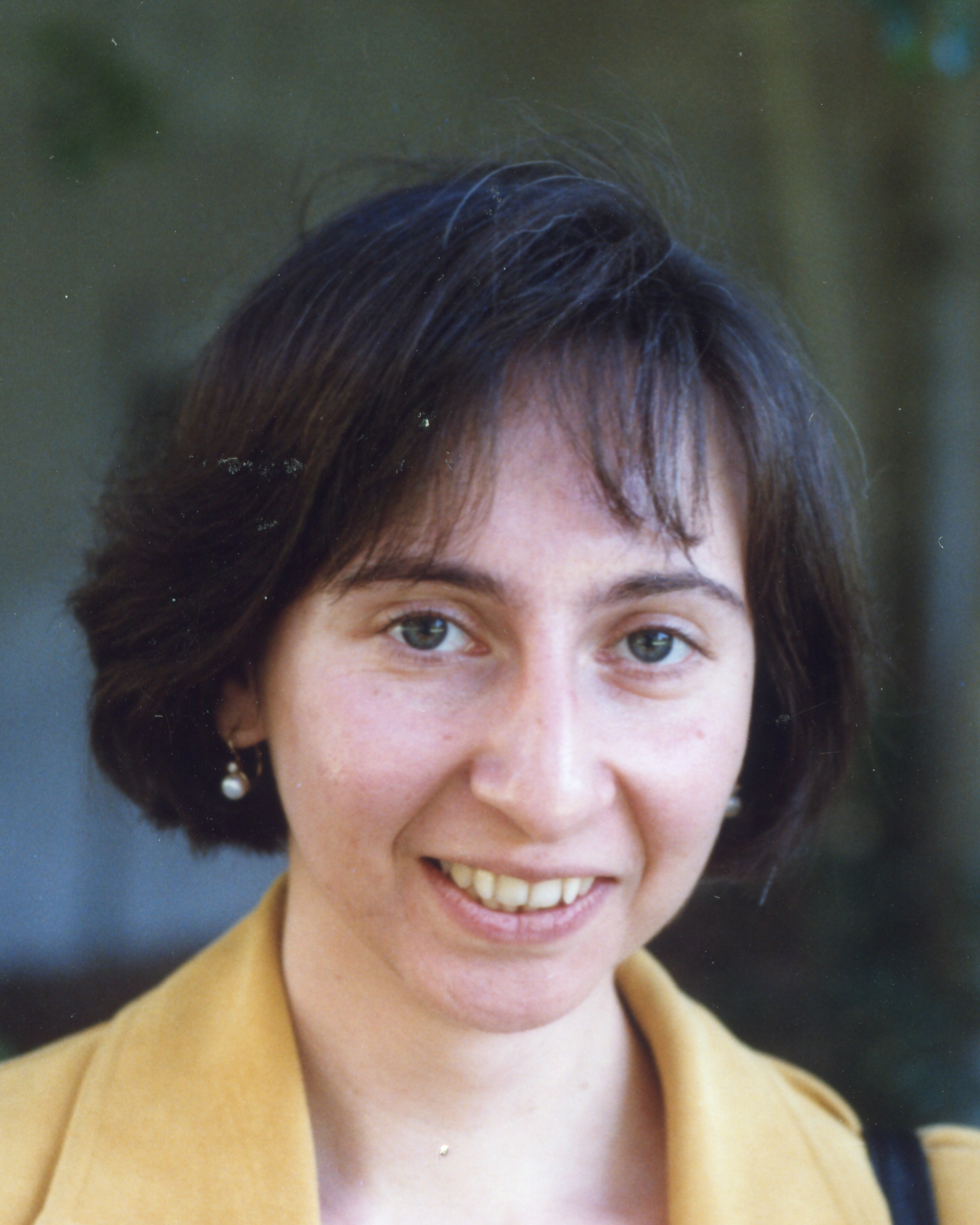
- Isabella Novik (1999)
- Born: 1971 (age 54–55)
- Education: Hebrew University of Jerusalem
- Awards: Nessyahu Prize; Sloan Research Fellowship; Fellow of the American Mathematical Society
- Scientific career
- Fields: Mathematics; Algebraic combinatorics Polyhedral combinatorics
- Workplaces: University of Washington
- Doctoral advisor: Gil Kalai

Isabella Novik (Hebrew: איזבלה נוביק; born 1971) is a mathematician who works at the University of Washington as the Robert R. and Elaine F. Phelps professor in mathematics. Her research concerns algebraic combinatorics and polyhedral combinatorics.

Novik earned her Ph.D. from the Hebrew University of Jerusalem in 1999, under the supervision of Gil Kalai. Her doctoral dissertation, Face Numbers of Polytopes and Manifolds, won the Haim Nessyahu Prize in Mathematics, awarded by the Israel Mathematical Union for the best annual doctoral dissertations in mathematics.

She was an Alfred P. Sloan research fellow for 2006–2008, and was elected as a member of the 2017 class of fellows of the American Mathematical Society "for contributions to algebraic and geometric combinatorics".
