= Israel Mathematical Union =

Israeli professional mathematician association

- האיגוד הישראלי למתמטיקה
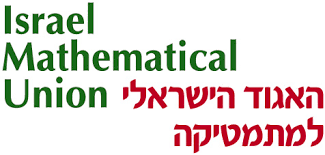
- Abbreviation: IMU
- Formation: March 2, 1953; 73 years ago
- Type: Professional association
- Region served: Israel
- Official language: Hebrew
- President: Mina Teicher
- Website: imu.org.il

The Israel Mathematical Union (IMU) (Hebrew: הַאִיגּוּד הַיִשְׂרְאֵלִי לְמָתֶמָטִיקָה) is an association of professional mathematicians in Israel. It is a member of the European Mathematical Society and the International Council for Industrial and Applied Mathematics, and has reciprocity membership agreements with the American Mathematical Society and the Society for Industrial and Applied Mathematics.

The Union was founded on 2 March 1953 and held its first meeting with eleven short lectures on 28 September of that year. Early members included Binyamin Amirà, Michael Fekete, and Abraham Fraenkel, who represented the Union at the 1954 International Congress of Mathematicians in Amsterdam, as well as Shmuel Agmon, Jacob Levitzki, and Dov Jarden.

== Prizes ==
The Israel Mathematical Union awards four major prizes:

- The Anna and Lajos Erdős Prize in Mathematics, awarded to an Israeli mathematician under the age of 41.
- The Levitzki Prize in Algebra, awarded biennially to a young Israeli mathematician for research in Algebra or related areas.
- The Haim Nessyahu Prize in Mathematics, awarded for outstanding achievements in a mathematical Ph.D. dissertation.
- The Abarbanel Prize in Applied Mathematics, awarded to an Israeli applied mathematician under the age of 48.

== Presidents ==
- Yakar Kannai (1981–1982)
- Shmuel Kantorovitz (1983–1984)
- Rafael Artzy (1985–1986)
- Moshe Jarden (1987–1988)
- Zvi Ziegler (1989–1990)
- Yisrael Aumann (1991–1992)
- Miriam Cohen (1993–1994)
- Stephen Gelbart (1995–1996)
- Lawrence Zalcman (1997–1998)
- Joseph Zaks (1999–2000)
- Vitali Milman (2001–2002)
- Allan Pinkus (2003–2004)
- Sergiu Hart (2005–2006)
- Michael Lin (2007–2008)
- Harry Dym (2009–2010)
- Louis H. Rowen (2011–2012)
- Alek Vainshtein (2013–2014)
- Vitali Milman (2015–2016)
- Koby Rubinstein (2017-2018)
- Alexander Lubotzky (2019-2020)
- Menachem Kojman (2021-2022)
- Gideon Schechtman (2023-2024)
- Mina Teicher (2025-2026)

== See also ==
- Einstein Institute of Mathematics
- Wolf Prize in Mathematics
