= Dvoretzky's theorem =

In mathematics, Dvoretzky's theorem is an important structural theorem about normed vector spaces proved by Aryeh Dvoretzky in the early 1960s, answering a question of Alexander Grothendieck. In essence, it says that every sufficiently high-dimensional normed vector space will have low-dimensional subspaces that are approximately Euclidean. Equivalently, every high-dimensional bounded symmetric convex set has low-dimensional sections that are approximately ellipsoids.

A new proof found by Vitali Milman in the 1970s was one of the starting points for the development of asymptotic geometric analysis (also called asymptotic functional analysis or the local theory of Banach spaces).

== Original formulations ==
For every natural number k ∈ N and every ε > 0 there exists a natural number N(k, ε) ∈ N such that if (X, ‖·‖) is any normed space of dimension N(k, ε), there exists a subspace E ⊂ X of dimension k and a positive definite quadratic form Q on E such that the corresponding Euclidean norm

$$| \cdot | = \sqrt{Q(\cdot)}$$

on E satisfies:

$$|x| \leq \|x\| \leq (1+\varepsilon)|x| \quad \text{for every} \ x \in E.$$

In terms of the multiplicative Banach-Mazur distance d the theorem's conclusion can be formulated as:

$$d(E,\ \ell_k^2)\leq 1+\varepsilon$$

where $\ell_k^2$ denotes the standard k-dimensional Euclidean space.

Since the unit ball of every normed vector space is a bounded, symmetric, convex set and the unit ball of every Euclidean space is an ellipsoid, the theorem may also be formulated as a statement about ellipsoid sections of convex sets.

As a consequence, we have the following statement. For any $\epsilon > 0$, we call a $\epsilon$-sphere a convex body $K$ such that there exists a ball $B$, such that $B \subset K \subset (1 + \epsilon) B$. Then, for any integer $n$ and any $\epsilon \in (0, 1)$, for all large enough $N$, and any $N$-dimensional centrally symmetric body, there exists an $n$-dimensional subspace $V \subset \R^N$, such that $K \cap V$ is an $\epsilon$-sphere.

== Further developments ==
In 1971, Vitali Milman gave a new proof of Dvoretzky's theorem, making use of the concentration of measure on the sphere to show that a random k-dimensional subspace satisfies the above inequality with probability very close to 1. The proof gives the sharp dependence on k:

$$N(k,\varepsilon)\leq\exp(C(\varepsilon)k)$$

where the constant C(ε) only depends on ε.

We can thus state: for every ε > 0 there exists a constant C(ε) > 0 such that for every normed space (X, ‖·‖) of dimension N, there exists a subspace E ⊂ X of dimension k ≥ C(ε) log N and a Euclidean norm |⋅| on E such that

$$|x| \leq \|x\| \leq (1+\varepsilon)|x| \quad \text{for every} \ x \in E.$$

More precisely, let S^{N − 1} denote the unit sphere with respect to some Euclidean structure Q on X, and let σ be the invariant probability measure on S^{N − 1}. Then:

- there exists such a subspace E with

$$k = \dim E \geq C(\varepsilon) \, \left(\frac{\int_{S^{N-1}} \| \xi \| \, d\sigma(\xi)}{\max_{\xi \in S^{N-1}} \| \xi \|}\right)^2 \, N.$$

- For any X one may choose Q so that the term in the brackets will be at most

$$c_1 \sqrt{\frac{\log N}{N}}.$$

Here c_{1} is a universal constant. For given X and ε, the largest possible k is denoted k_{*}(X) and called the Dvoretzky dimension of X.

The dependence on ε was studied by Yehoram Gordon, who showed that k_{*}(X) ≥ c_{2} ε^{2} log N. Another proof of this result was given by Gideon Schechtman.

Noga Alon and Vitali Milman showed that the logarithmic bound on the dimension of the subspace in Dvoretzky's theorem can be significantly improved, if one is willing to accept a subspace that is close either to a Euclidean space or to a Chebyshev space. Specifically, for some constant c, every n-dimensional space has a subspace of dimension k ≥ exp(c√log N) that is close either to ℓ^{k}_{2} or to ℓ^{k}_{∞}.

Important related results were proved by Tadeusz Figiel, Joram Lindenstrauss and Milman.
