= Franck Barthe =

French mathematician

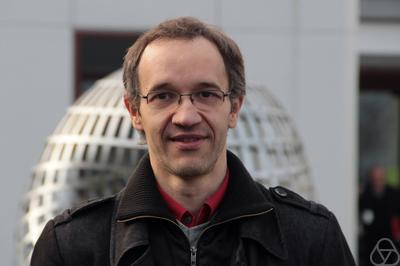
- At the MFO, 2015
- Education: University of Marne-la-Vallée
- Awards: EMS Prize 2004, Prix Jacques Herbrand 2005
- Scientific career
- Fields: Probability theory
- Workplaces: University of Toulouse
- Thesis: (1997)
- Doctoral advisors: Alain Pajor, Bernard Maurey
- Website: http://www.math.univ-toulouse.fr/~barthe

Franck Barthe is a French mathematician. He was awarded the European Congress of Mathematics (ECM) prize in 2004. He is working as a professor of mathematics at Paul Sabatier University.

== Work ==
Franck Barthe is known for his reverse form of the Brascamp-Lieb inequality. With Keith M. Ball, Shiri Artstein, and Assaf Naor, he solved Shannon's problem of the monotonic entropy increase of sums of random variables.

== Awards ==
In 2004, he received the EMS Prize (prize presentation: isoperimetric inequalities, probability measures and convex geometry) for his leading role in the application of mass-theoretical transport techniques.

In 2005, he received the Grand Prix Jacques Herbrand.
