= Keith Martin Ball =

British mathematician

Professor Keith Ball FRS FRSE
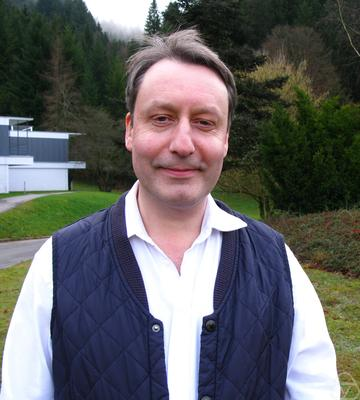
- Ball in 2009
- Born: Keith Martin Ball; 26 December 1960 (age 65); New York City
- Education: Trinity College, Cambridge
- Awards: FRS (2013); FRSE (2013); Shephard Prize (2015)
- Scientific career
- Fields: Functional analysis; Discrete geometry; Information theory
- Workplaces: University of Cambridge; University of Warwick; ICMS; Texas A&M University; University College London
- Thesis: Isometric problems in lpÌ² and sections of convex sets (1986)
- Doctoral advisor: Béla Bollobás
- Website: keithmball.wordpress.com; www2.warwick.ac.uk/fac/sci/maths/people/staff/keith_ball

Keith Martin Ball (born 26 December 1960) is a mathematician and professor at the University of Warwick. He was scientific director of the International Centre for Mathematical Sciences (ICMS) from 2010 to 2014.

== Education ==
Ball was educated at Berkhamsted School and Trinity College, Cambridge where he studied the Cambridge Mathematical Tripos and was awarded a Bachelor of Arts degree in mathematics in 1982 and a PhD in 1987 for research supervised by Béla Bollobás.

== Research ==
Keith Ball's research is in the fields of functional analysis, high-dimensional and discrete geometry and information theory. He is the author of Strange Curves, Counting Rabbits, & Other Mathematical Explorations.

== Awards and honours ==
Ball was elected a Fellow of the American Mathematical Society (AMS) in 2012 and a Fellow of the Royal Society (FRS) in 2013. His Royal Society citation reads

Keith Ball is an exceptionally original mathematician whose work has had a major influence on two branches of mathematics: functional analysis and information theory. He proved the first extension theorems for Lipschitz functions not reducible to one-point extensions and solved the reverse isoperimetric problem. He produced a sharp version of the Banach-Steinhaus Theorem conjectured in the 50s, and proved that infinitely many values of the Riemann function at odd integers are irrational (with Rivoal). (With Artstein, Barthe and Naor) he answered a fundamental question in information theory by showing that the central limit theorem of probability is driven by an analogue of the second law of thermodynamics. Since 2010 Ball has served as Scientific Director of ICMS in Edinburgh. He also successfully popularises science, for example in his book "Strange curves. ... "

In 2023, he was elected a member of the Academia Europaea.
