= Albert Einstein Institute =

Albert Einstein Institute or similar may refer to:

- The Max Planck Institute for Gravitational Physics, a physics research institute in Germany
- The Albert Einstein Institution, a non-profit organisation involved in non-violent methods of political resistance (based in the United States)
- The Einstein Institute of Mathematics, a mathematics research institute in Israel
