= Asymptotic geometry =

Branch of mathematics

Asymptotic geometry, also known as asymptotic geometric analysis or high-dimensional geometry, is a field of mathematics that investigates the geometric properties of finite-dimensional objects, such as convex bodies and normed spaces, as the dimension tends to infinity. It is at the intersection of convex geometry and functional analysis.

The primary objects of study are typically finite-dimensional normed spaces, which can be represented as $\mathbb{R}^n$ equipped with a norm $\|\cdot\|$, or equivalently, a unit ball $K_X = \{x \in \mathbb{R}^n : \|x\| \le 1\}$, which is a centrally symmetric, compact, convex set with a non-empty interior.

== History ==
One early approach to Banach space theory was the "local theory of normed spaces", which aimed to understand infinite-dimensional Banach spaces by examining their finite-dimensional subspaces and quotient spaces. John von Neumann in 1942 studied the asymptotic behavior of $E^n$ (n-dimensional Euclidean space) and $M_n$ (the space of n×n matrices) for finite $n$ as $n \to \infty$, as a distinct approach from studying actually infinite-dimensional Hilbert space. This gradually led to the study of high-dimensional normed spaces for their own sake, not merely as a tool for understanding infinite-dimensional ones, beginning in the 1980s.

== Concepts ==
=== High-dimensional phenomena ===
High-dimensional spaces have many properties that violate intuitions formed in low-dimensional spaces, and these are generally called "surprises in high dimensions". For instance, the volume of the Euclidean unit ball $B_2^n$ in $\mathbb{R}^n$, denoted $\kappa_n$, does not uniformly increase with dimension. While $\kappa_1 = 2$, $\kappa_2 = \pi$, $\kappa_3 = 4\pi/3$, $\kappa_4 \approx 4.93$, $\kappa_5 \approx 5.26$, the volume $\kappa_n = \frac{\pi^{n/2}}{\Gamma(\frac{n}{2} + 1)} \sim (n^{-1/2}\sqrt{2\pi e})^n$. This implies that for large $n$, the unit ball occupies a vanishingly small fraction of the volume of its circumscribing cube.

High-dimensional convex bodies are sometimes depicted with a "hyperbolic" form to visually represent the rapid (often exponential) decay of the volume of their parallel sections away from the median level, a consequence of the Brunn–Minkowski inequality.

=== Concentration of measure ===
Under certain general conditions, a function defined on a high-dimensional space (like a sphere or Gauss space) that does not vary too rapidly (e.g., a Lipschitz function) is almost constant over most of the space, concentrating sharply around its mean or median value. These are called concentration of measure phenomena.

For example, consider the Euclidean unit sphere $S^{n-1}$ in $\mathbb{R}^n$ with its normalized Lebesgue measure. If $A$ is a subset of $S^{n-1}$ with measure $1/2$, then its $\varepsilon$-extension $A_\varepsilon$ (the set of points within Euclidean or geodesic distance $\varepsilon$ from $A$) will have measure exponentially close to 1 as $n$ increases, for a fixed $\varepsilon > 0$. The complement $S^{n-1} \setminus A_\varepsilon$ will have measure decreasing to 0 exponentially fast. This implies, for instance, that an $\varepsilon$-neighborhood of any equator contains almost the entire measure of the sphere in high dimensions, a surprise in high dimensions.

=== Isomorphism ===
Classical geometry often deals with isometric properties, where exact distances and shapes are preserved. In contrast, asymptotic geometry focuses on isomorphic properties. An "isomorphic" geometric object refers to a family of objects in spaces of increasing dimension, and an "isomorphic" geometric property is one shared by the high-dimensional members of this family. The interest is to study the asymptotic behavior of geometric quantities as dimension grows.

A significant part of the theory involves establishing geometric inequalities in an "isomorphic" form. These inequalities provide bounds that are not necessarily exact, but hold up to universal constants, particularly in high dimensions. Basic examples include "isomorphic isoperimetric inequalities" which are closely linked to the concentration of measure phenomenon.

=== Randomness and patterns ===
Random structures in high dimensions often leads to highly predictable patterns and phenomena. The prototypical cases are the laws of large numbers. While an increase in dimensions might lead to greater diversity and complexity, effects like measure concentration often lead to a reduction in diversity, with many possibilities collapsing into one or a few typical behaviors. Objects created by independent, identically distributed random processes, while individually distinct, often share statistical similarities.

=== Positioning ===
There are different canonical ways to orient a convex body. They reveal different aspects of underlying symmetries or extremal properties, and have different theoretical uses. Generally, for each such position, every convex body can be linearly bijected to a body in such a position, and the linear bijection is unique up to orthogonal transformations.

A convex body is in the John position if its maximal volume inscribed ellipsoid (the John ellipsoid) is the unit sphere $B_2^n$. It is in the minimal surface area position if it has the least surface area among all its linear bijection images. It is in the isotropic position if it has the if it has unit volume (in Lebesgue measure), its barycenter is at the origin, and its inertia matrix is a multiple of the identity matrix.

An M-position (discovered by V. Milman) of a convex body $K$ is defined as follows. First, the body is scaled to have unit 1. Then, the volume of the Minkowski sum $TK + B_2^n$ is minimized, where $T$ ranges over all volume-preserving linear maps. It produces an ellipsoid with the same volume that often can replace $K$ in computations, up to universal constants. This technique leads to important "reverse" inequalities:

- The reverse Santaló inequality (by Bourgain and Milman) provides a lower bound for the Mahler product $s(K) = \text{Vol}_n(K)\text{Vol}_n(K^\circ)$, where $K^\circ$ is the polar body of $K$. While the Santaló inequality gives an upper bound $s(K) / s(B_2^n) \leq 1$, the reverse inequality shows $(s(K)/s(B_2^n))^{1/n} \ge c$ for some universal $c > 0$.
- The reverse Brunn–Minkowski inequality states that for any pair of convex bodies $K$ and $T$ in M-position, one has $\text{Vol}_n(K+T)^{1/n} \le C (\text{Vol}_n(K)^{1/n} + \text{Vol}_n(T)^{1/n})$ for some universal constant $C$. Note that the classical Brunn-Minkowski inequality is of form $\cdots \geq 1 \cdot(\cdots)$.

=== Gaussianity ===
Comparison principles for Gaussian processes (e.g., Slepian's lemma) provide powerful tools for proving sharper bounds for results similar to the Dvoretzky's theorem. Related is the use of Gaussian measures.

=== Complexity ===
Covering numbers, entropy numbers, Rademacher complexity, VC dimension. Quantities that measure the "size" or complexity of a set, or relatively among several sets, playing a significant role in estimates.

=== Log-concave measures ===
The study of volume distribution often extends to the more general setting of log-concave measures, for which notions like isotropicity can be defined. Paouris's deviation inequality for isotropic log-concave measures and Klartag's central limit theorem for their marginals are significant results in this area.

=== Others ===
- Thin-shell estimates.
- Stochastic localization, introduced by Ronen Eldan in a 2013 paper.
- Symmetrization.

== Main results ==
=== Dvoretzky's Theorem ===
Dvoretzky's theorem (or the Dvoretzky–Milman theorem) states that every centrally symmetric convex body in a sufficiently high dimension $n$ has central sections of a certain dimension $k$ that are almost ellipsoidal. Specifically, for any $n$-dimensional normed space $X = (\mathbb{R}^n, \|\cdot\|)$ and any $\varepsilon \in (0, 1)$, there exists a $k$-dimensional subspace $F$ of $X$ with $k \ge c \varepsilon^2 \log n$ (where $c$ is a universal constant) such that the Banach-Mazur distance between $F$ and the $k$-dimensional Euclidean space $\ell_2^k$ is at most $1+\varepsilon$, $d_{BM}(F, \ell_2^k) \le 1+\varepsilon$.

It can be proved by a concentration of measure on the Euclidean sphere $S^{n-1}$, showing that the values of the norm $\|\cdot\|$ on $S^{n-1}$ concentrate around their average $M = \int_{S^{n-1}} \|x\| d\sigma(x)$.

=== Hyperplane conjecture ===
A long-standing open problem in convex geometry and asymptotic geometric analysis is the hyperplane conjecture, also known as the slicing problem. It asks whether there exists a universal constant $c > 0$ such that, for any convex body $K$ in $\mathbb{R}^n$ of volume 1, with its barycenter at the origin, there exists a hyperplane $H$ through the origin such that the $(n-1)$-dimensional volume of $K \cap H$ is greater than $c$. Intuitively, it asks whether convex bodies always have some slice through which it appears large.

This problem is equivalent to asking whether the moment of inertia of every isotropic convex body is bounded by a universal constant $C$. An isotropic convex body $K$ is one with volume 1, barycenter at the origin, and an inertia matrix that is a multiple of the identity: $\int_K \langle x, \theta \rangle^2 dx = L_K^2$ for every unit vector $\theta$. While the conjecture remains open, significant progress has been made, with current best bounds for $L_n$ being of the order $L_n \le c \sqrt[4]{n}$.

=== Quotient of subspace theorem ===
Quotient of subspace theorem, or Milman's M*-estimate, concerns the geometry of proportional-dimensional subspaces and quotients, showing that the diameter of a random "proportional section" of a high-dimensional centrally symmetric convex body $K$ is controlled by the mean width $M^*(K)$ of the body.

== Related fields ==
Asymptotic geometry is related to several other mathematical disciplines, and commonly studied together with these.

- Functional analysis: Its historical root, particularly the theory of Banach spaces.
- Convex geometry: Normed spaces are defined by convex bodies, and so the geometry of normed spaces and the geometry of convex bodies are two perspectives on essentially the same subject.
- Probability: Probabilistic methods are fundamental tools, and many probabilistic statements, such as the laws of large numbers, can be interpreted in the framework of asymptotic geometry.
- Information theory: Concepts like entropy and covering numbers have information-theoretic interpretations.
- Statistical learning theory: Concepts such as Rademacher complexity can be interpreted geometrically.
- Number theory: Early motivations for high-dimensional geometry came from number theory (e.g., Minkowski's geometry of numbers).

== See also ==
- Convex geometry
- Normed vector space
- Banach space
- Dvoretzky's theorem
- Concentration of measure
- Brunn–Minkowski inequality
- Minkowski addition
