= Semyon Alesker =

Israeli mathematician

- סמיון אלסקר
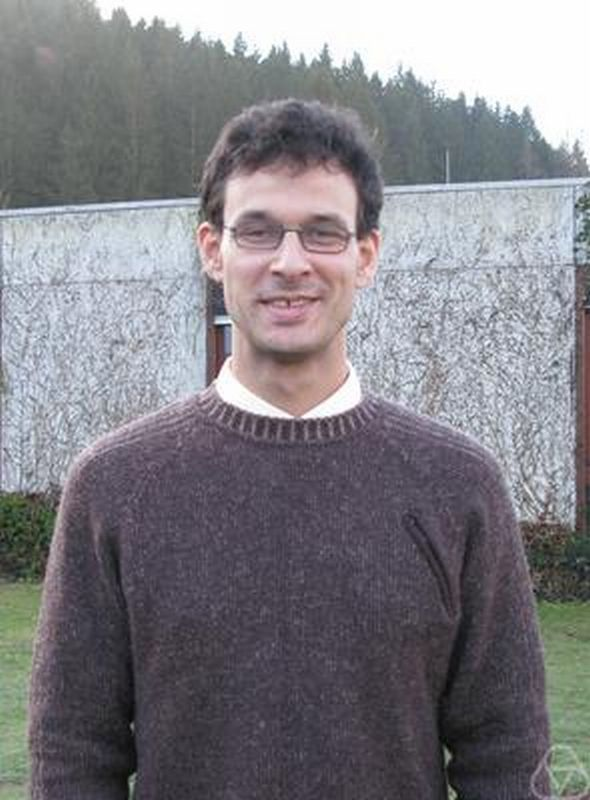
- Alesker in 2010
- Born: 1972 (age 53–54)
- Education: Tel Aviv University
- Awards: EMS Prize (2000); Erdős Prize (2004)
- Scientific career
- Fields: Mathematics
- Doctoral advisor: Vitali Milman

Semyon Alesker (Hebrew: סמיון אלסקר; born 1972) is an Israeli mathematician at Tel Aviv University. For his contributions in convex geometry and integral geometry, in particular his work on valuations, he won the EMS Prize in 2000, and the Erdős Prize in 2004.
