= Knots Unravelled =

2011 knot theory book by Meike Akveld and Andrew Jobbings

First edition

Knots Unravelled: From String to Mathematics is a book on the mathematics of knots, intended for schoolchildren and other non-mathematicians. It was written by mathematician Meike Akveld and mathematics publisher Andrew Jobbings. It was published in 2011 by Arbelos, Jobbings's firm.

== Topics ==
The main problem studied in the book is the use of knot invariants to test whether a loop is knotted or distinguish knots from each other. It has seven short chapters, separated by "interludes" providing examples including Celtic knots, knotted papercraft, neckties, ropework, torus knots, and a form of the trefoil knot that can only sit on a plane with two points in contact. Small exercises, called "tasks" and often involving practical experiments rather than mathematical calculation, are scattered throughout the book, with answers at the end.

The first chapter is introductory, and the second describes knot diagrams and the Reidemeister moves that change one diagram to another without changing the underlying knot. The next three chapters discuss particular knot invariants. These begin with the crossing number of a knot, the minimum number of crossings in its diagrams. Chapter four discusses another invariant, the unknotting number, the minimum number of local changes to a diagram that can unknot a given knot, while also discussing chirality (the phenomenon of a knot being different from its mirror image) and composite knots. Chapter five covers tricolorability, an invariant defined by coloring the arcs of a diagram according to certain rules. Chapter six generalizes the problem from knots to links, systems of more than two loops that cannot be separated from each other. The final chapter, necessarily more mathematical than the others, is on the Jones polynomial.

Other material in the book includes historical asides, pointers to research topics, many illustrations, and an appendix with a table of small knots.

== Audience and reception ==
This book is unusual among books on knot theory, an advanced mathematical subject, in being written for laypeople and schoolchildren, with no equations and little calculation. Knot theorist Scott Taylor describes it as "filled with delightful mathematical ideas", an ideal way to attract bored students to mathematics, and Jeff Johannes describes it as "my new favourite for introducing knot theory to non-mathematicians". However, reviewer Roger Fenn suggests that, for use in secondary-school mathematics classes, the section giving solutions to the tasks needs expansion.
