= Quotient of subspace theorem =

In mathematics, the quotient of subspace theorem is an important property of finite-dimensional normed spaces, discovered by Vitali Milman.

Let (X, ||·||) be an N-dimensional normed space. There exist subspaces Z ⊂ Y ⊂ X such that the following holds:

- The quotient space E = Y / Z is of dimension dim E ≥ c N, where c > 0 is a universal constant.
- The induced norm || · || on E, defined by

$$\| e \| =\min_{y \in e} \| y \|, \quad e \in E,$$

is uniformly isomorphic to Euclidean. That is, there exists a positive quadratic form ("Euclidean structure") Q on E, such that

$\frac{\sqrt{Q(e)}}{K} \leq \| e \| \leq K \sqrt{Q(e)}$ for $e \in E,$

with K > 1 a universal constant.

The statement is relatively easy to prove by induction on the dimension of Z (even for Y=Z, X=0, c=1) with a K that depends only on N; the point of the theorem is that K is independent of N.

In fact, the constant c can be made arbitrarily close to 1, at the expense of the constant K becoming large. The original proof allowed

$c(K) \approx 1 - \text{const} / \log \log K.$
