= Shmuel Agmon =

Israeli mathematician (1922–2025)

- שמואל אגמון
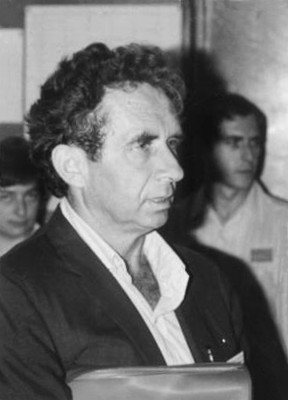
- Agmon in Nice in 1970
- Born: 2 February 1922; Tel Aviv, Mandatory Palestine
- Died: 21 March 2025 (aged 103); Jerusalem, Israel
- Education: Paris-Sorbonne University
- Spouse(s): Galia Yardeni-Agmon; Nechama de-Shalit
- Awards: Weizmann Prize (1956); Israel Prize (1991); EMET Prize (2007)
- Scientific career
- Fields: Analysis, partial differential equations
- Workplaces: Einstein Institute of Mathematics
- Doctoral advisor: Szolem Mandelbrojt
- Doctoral students: Eli Shamir

Shmuel Agmon (Hebrew: שמואל אגמון; 2 February 1922 – 21 March 2025) was an Israeli mathematician who was known for his work in analysis and partial differential equations.

== Biography ==
Shmuel Agmon was born in Tel Aviv, in what was then British-ruled Mandatory Palestine, to Nathan and Chaya Agmon (née Gutman). His father was a prominent writer and his mother was a dentist. Agmon spent the first two years of his life living in Nazareth, where his mother ran a clinic, before the family moved to Jerusalem, where his younger brother Yaakov was born in 1924. He was identified as a gifted child in school, excelling in mathematics and classical literature. He was also a Jerusalem youth chess champion. A member of the HaMahanot HaOlim youth movement, Agmon attended high school at the Rehavia Gymnasium and after graduating he joined a hakhshara program at kibbutz Na'an in 1939.

He began his studies in mathematics at the Hebrew University of Jerusalem in 1940. His teachers included Michael Fekete, Abraham Fraenkel, Binyamin Amirà, and Jakob Levitzki. In 1942, Agmon interrupted his studies and enlisted in the British Army, serving in an anti-aircraft unit and then the Jewish Brigade. He served for four years in Palestine, Cyprus, Italy, and Belgium during and immediately after World War II. While on leave in Paris after the war, he purchased works by French mathematician Édouard Goursat from a local bookstore to resume studying mathematics.

After being discharged from the British Army in 1946, Agmon completed his undergraduate and master's degrees at the Hebrew University and went to France for further studies in 1947. He learned of the passage of the United Nations Partition Plan for Palestine while en route to France by ship in November 1947. He obtained a PhD from Paris-Sorbonne University in 1949, under the supervision of Szolem Mandelbrojt. He then went to the United States and worked as a visiting scholar at Rice University from 1950 to 1952 before returning to Jerusalem. He joined the faculty of the Hebrew University of Jerusalem in 1952 and became a full professor in 1959. He was elected to membership in the Israel Academy of Sciences and Humanities in 1964. Agmon retired in 1990 but continued to conduct research. He published his final paper in 2011.

In 1947, Agmon married Galia Yardeni, a scholar in the fields of literature and the history of journalism in the Land of Israel. They had three sons, all of whom would become academics: Noam Agmon, a theoretical chemist, Ariel Agmon, a neurobiologist, and Eitan Agmon, a musicologist. Galia died in 1968. He subsequently married Nechama de-Shalit, a psychiatrist and the widow of Amos de-Shalit, in 1972. Nechama died in 1998.

Agmon died on 21 March 2025, at the age of 103.

== Work ==
After joining the Hebrew University in 1952, Agmon initially taught a course on partial differential equations. He worked on aspects of elliptic-hyperbolic equations in the 1950s, including the Euler–Tricomi equation. He collaborated with Louis Nirenberg and Avron Douglis in producing two groundbreaking works on elliptic partial differential boundary value problems in 1959 and 1964 that became among the most cited works in mathematical analysis. Agmon's contributions to partial differential equations include Agmon's method for proving exponential decay of eigenfunctions for elliptic operators. In 1965 he published a book on linear boundary value problems for elliptic partial differential equations of general order that became a foundational work in the field. He also taught an advanced undergraduate course on classical analysis. From the mid-1960s, he worked on spectral theory and scattering theory of Schrödinger-type equations, publishing works significant to mathematical physics. Notably, he made precise estimates on the decay of eigenfunctions of the Schrödinger equation in terms of a metric he defined, which became known as the Agmon metric. His work contributed to the understanding of wave function scattering for short range and long range potentials.

== Awards ==
Agmon was awarded the 1991 Israel Prize in mathematics. He received the 2007 EMET Prize "for paving new paths in the study of partial-elliptical differential equations and their problematic language and for advancing the knowledge in the field, as well as his essential contribution to the development of the Spectral Theory and the Distribution Theory of Schrödinger Operators." He has also received the Weizmann Prize and the Rothschild Prize. In 2012, he became a fellow of the American Mathematical Society.

== Selected works ==
- Agmon, Shmuel (1951). "Functions of exponential type in an angle and singularities of Taylor series". Trans. Amer. Math. Soc. 70 (3): 492–508. doi:10.1090/s0002-9947-1951-0041222-5. MR 0041222.
- with Lipman Bers: Agmon, Shmuel; Bers, Lipman (1952). "The expansion theorem for pseudo-analytic functions". Proc. Amer. Math. Soc. 3 (5): 757–764. doi:10.1090/s0002-9939-1952-0057349-4. MR 0057349.
- Agmon, Shmuel (1953). "Complex variable Tauberians". Trans. Amer. Math. Soc. 74 (3): 444–481. doi:10.1090/s0002-9947-1953-0054079-5. MR 0054079.
- Agmon, Shmuel (1960). "Maximum theorems for solutions of higher order elliptic equations". Bull. Amer. Math. Soc. 66 (2): 77–80. doi:10.1090/s0002-9904-1960-10402-8. MR 0124618.
- Lectures on elliptic boundary value problems. Van Nostrand. 1965. iii+291 p.; 2nd edition. AMS Chelsea Pub. 2010. ISBN 978-0-8218-4910-1.
- Unicité et convexité dans les problèmes différentiels. Presses de l'Université de Montréal. 1966. 156 p.
- Spectral properties of Schrödinger operators and scattering theory. Scuola normale superiore di Pisa. 1975.
- Lectures on exponential decay of solutions of second-order elliptic equations: bounds on eigenfunctions of N-body Schrödinger operators. Princeton University Press. 1982. ISBN 978-0-691-08318-6.

== See also ==
- Agmon's inequality
