= Michael Lin (mathematician) =

Israeli mathematician

- מיכאל לין
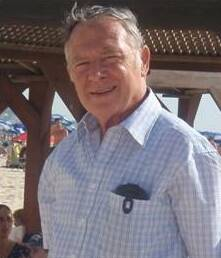
- Born: June 8, 1942 (age 84); Tel Aviv, Israel
- Education: The Hebrew University of Jerusalem, Ohio State University
- Scientific career
- Fields: Mathematics: Ergodic theory; Markov chain
- Workplaces: Ben-Gurion University of the Negev, Achva Academic College

Michael Lin (Hebrew: מיכאל לין; born June 8, 1942) is an Israeli mathematician, who has published scientific articles in the field of probability concentrating on Markov chains and ergodic theory. He serves as professor emeritus at the Department of Mathematics in Ben-Gurion University of the Negev (BGU). Additionally, he is a member of the academic board and serves as the academic coordinator at Achva Academic College.

== Biography ==
Michael Lin was born in Israel. He holds a Bachelor of Science in Mathematics and Physics from The Hebrew University of Jerusalem (1963), Master of Science in Mathematics (1967) and a PhD in Mathematics also from The Hebrew University of Jerusalem (1971). In 1971 he was appointed as an assistant professor in Ohio State University. In 1976 he returned to Israel and became a senior lecturer in the Department of Mathematics at Ben-Gurion University of the Negev. Only 4 years later, at 1979, he became an associate professor and in 1984 he became a full professor. In 2011, Professor Lin retired and nowadays he serves as professor emeritus. During his career at Ben-Gurion University of the Negev he acted as:

- Computer Science Coordinator, Department of Mathematics and Computer Science, BGU.
- Member of BGU Computer Policy committee.
- Chairman and Computer Science Coordinator, Department of Mathematics and Computer Science, BGU.
- Senate representative to Executive Committee of Board of Trustees of BGU.
- Senate representative to the BGU Executive Committee's subcommittee for student affairs.
- President, Israel Mathematical Union.
- Head of the Ethical Code Committee of BGU.

In 2004 Professor Lin also acted as a member of the committee electing the recipients of the Israel Prize in mathematics.

== Research and publications ==
Professor Lin's published work focuses on two main areas of research in the field of probability: Ergodic theory and Markov chain. More specifically, he researched in several areas: mean and individual Ergodic theory, Central limit theorem and functional analysis.
