= Bo'az Klartag =

Israeli mathematician (born 1978)

Boaz Klartag
- בועז קלרטג
- Born: April 25, 1978 (age 48)
- Education: Tel Aviv University
- Known for: Contributions in asymptotic geometric analysis
- Awards: EMS Prize (2008), Erdős Prize (2010)
- Scientific career
- Fields: Mathematics
- Workplaces: Weizmann Institute of Science, Tel Aviv University
- Doctoral advisor: Vitali Milman

Bo'az Klartag (Hebrew: בועז קלרטג; born 25 April 1978) is an Israeli mathematician. He currently is a professor at the Weizmann Institute, and prior to that he was a professor at the Department of Pure Mathematics of Tel Aviv University, where he earned his doctorate under the supervision of Vitali Milman. Klartag made contributions in asymptotic geometric analysis and won the 2008 EMS Prize, as well as the 2010 Erdős Prize. He is an editor of the Journal d'Analyse Mathématique.

== Selected works ==
- Klartag, Bo'az (2026). "Lattice packing of spheres in high dimensions using a stochastically evolving ellipsoid". Inventiones Mathematicae. 244: 1251–1279. arXiv:2504.05042. doi:10.1007/s00222-026-01412-w.
- ——— (2007). "A central limit theorem for convex sets". Inventiones Mathematicae. 168 (1): 91–131. arXiv:math/0605014. Bibcode:2007InMat.168...91K. doi:10.1007/s00222-006-0028-8. S2CID 119169773.
- ——— (2006). "On convex perturbations with a bounded isotropic constant". Geometric and Functional Analysis. 16 (6): 1274–1290. doi:10.1007/s00039-006-0588-1. S2CID 43190254.
- ——— (2002). "5n Minkowski Symmetrizations Suffice to Arrive at an Approximate Euclidean Ball". Annals of Mathematics. 156 (3): 947–960. arXiv:math/0204212. doi:10.2307/3597288. JSTOR 3597288. S2CID 119670071.
