= Tuval Foguel =

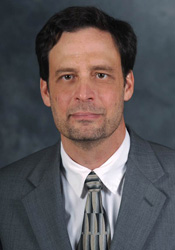
Tuval Foguel

Tuval Shmuel Foguel is Professor of Mathematics at Adelphi University in Garden City, New York. Tuval Foguel was born in 1959 in Berkeley, California to Hava and Shaul Foguel and he is a descendant of Saul Wahl. Through his mother Hava (née Sokolow), Professor Foguel is related to Nahum Sokolow. Professor Foguel received his B.S. in mathematics from York College, City University of New York in 1988 and his PhD in Mathematics under Michio Suzuki from the University of Illinois at Urbana–Champaign in 1992 with a focus on finite groups. He has introduced the term conjugate-permutable subgroup. In the past, Professor Foguel has also taught at the University of the West Indies, North Dakota State University, Auburn University Montgomery, and Western Carolina University.

== Selected articles ==
- Tuval Foguel, Josh Hiller (2020), A note on Abelian Partitionable groups, Communications in Algebra, 48, no.8, 3268–3274.
- Tuval Foguel, Josh Hiller (2019), On Bruck's Prolongation and Contraction Maps, Quasigroups and Related Systems 27, 53–62.
- Tuval Foguel, Nicholas Sizemore (2018), Partition Numbers of Finite Solvable Groups, Advances in Group Theory and Applications 6, 55–67.
- Tuval Foguel and Josh Hiller (2016), A Note On Subloop Lattices. Results in Mathematics, 69, no.1, 11–21.
- Tuval Foguel, Baojun Li (2015), On $\Pi$-property and $\Pi$-normality of subgroups of finite groups (II). Algebra and Logic, 54, No. 3, 211–225.
- Risto Atanasov, Tuval Foguel (2014) Loops That Are Partitioned by Groups, Journal of Group Theory17, no. 5, 851–861.
- Risto Atanasov, Tuval Foguel, Jeff Lawson (2013), Optimizing Capstone With Multiple Constraints PRIMUS 24, no.4, 392–402.
- Tuval Foguel, Michael K. Kinyon, J.D. Phillips (2006), On twisted subgroups and Bol loops of odd order, Rocky Mountain Journal of Mathematics 36 no.1, 183–212.
- Tuval Foguel, Luise-Charlotte Kappe (2005), On loops covered by subloops, Expositiones Mathematicae 23, 255 – 270.
- Tuval Foguel, Abraham A. Ungar (2000), Involutory Decomposition of Groups into Twisted Subgroups and Subgroups, Journal of Group Theory 3, no. 1, 27–46.
- Tuval Foguel (1997), Conjugate - Permutable Subgroups, Journal of Algebra, 191, 235 -239.
- Tuval Foguel (1995), Finite Groups with a Special 2-Generator Property, Pacific Journal of Mathematics, 170, no. 2, 483–496
- Tuval Foguel (1994), On Seminormal Subgroups, Journal of Algebra, 165, no. 3, 633–636.
- N. Boston, W. Dabrowski, Tuval Foguel, P.J. Gies, D.A. Jackson, J. Leavitt, D.T. Ose (1993), The Proportion of Fixed-Point-Free Elements of a Transitive Permutation Group, Communications in *Algebra, 21, no. 9, 3259–3275.
- Tuval Foguel (1992), Galois-Theoretical Groups, Journal of Algebra, 150, no. 2, 321–323.

== See also ==
- Conjugate-permutable subgroup
