= Esther Seiden =

Mathematical statistician (1908–2014)

- אסתר זיידן
- Born: March 9, 1908; West Galicia
- Died: June 3, 2014 (aged 106)
- Education: University of Warsaw, University of California, Berkeley
- Known for: Design of experiments, combinatorial design theory
- Awards: Fellow of the Institute of Mathematical Statistics, Member of the International Statistical Institute
- Scientific career
- Fields: Statistics
- Workplaces: Michigan State University, Hebrew University of Jerusalem
- Doctoral advisor: Jerzy Neyman

Esther Seiden (Hebrew: אסתר זיידן; March 9, 1908 – June 3, 2014) was a mathematical statistician known for her research on the design of experiments and combinatorial design theory. In the study of finite geometry, she introduced the concept of the complement of an oval, and her work with Rita Zemach on orthogonal arrays of strength four was described as "the first significant progress" on the subject.

== Early life and education ==
Seiden was born to a Polish-speaking Jewish middle-class family in West Galicia, and educated at a Zionist gymnasium in Kraków. Against her father's wishes, she went into mathematics. She began her university studies at the University of Kraków but moved after a year to Stefan Batory University in Vilnius, where an uncle was a high school mathematics teacher. There, as well as pure mathematics, she also studied physics and mathematical logic.

Although she planned a teaching career with the master's degree she earned, her instructors provided support to continue her studies for another year. By that time, violence between anti-Jewish student groups and Jewish counter-protesters in Vilnius had led to the death of a student, so she was sent away to the University of Warsaw, where she studied logic with Alfred Tarski and Stanisław Leśniewski.

== Activism in Palestine ==
After completing her studies, Seiden became a schoolteacher at a Jewish school from 1932 to 1934. By this time, she had long felt like a second-class citizen in Europe and wished to move to Mandatory Palestine. With the help of recommendations from Tarski and one of her Vilnius professors, she obtained admission to the Hebrew University of Jerusalem, which allowed her to move there in 1935. In Palestine, she continued her work as a teacher, and studied mathematics at the Hebrew University under Abraham Fraenkel. However, her interest in mathematics diminished as she became involved in the paramilitary Haganah and then worked in the Red Cross during World War II.

== Statistics ==
At the end of the war, Seiden came to work for the Palestine Census of Industry and began studying statistics under Aryeh Dvoretzky. On the recommendation of Tarski, she entered graduate study in statistics at the University of California, Berkeley in 1947 as an assistant to Jerzy Neyman. She began her work in experimental design, a topic she came to through lectures from Berkeley visitor Raj Chandra Bose. She completed her Ph.D. in 1949. Her dissertation, supervised by Neyman, was On a problem of confounding in symmetrical factorial design. Contribution to the theory of tests of composite hypotheses.

After shorter positions on the faculties of the University of Buffalo, University of Chicago, University of Chicago, American University, Northwestern University, and the Indian Statistical Institute, she moved to Michigan State University in 1960. She retired from Michigan State in 1978, only to return to the Hebrew University as a faculty member, and she remained active at the Hebrew University for many more years.

== Recognition ==
In 1976, Seiden was elected as a member of the International Statistical Institute. She was also a Fellow of the Institute of Mathematical Statistics.
