= Entropy influence conjecture =

In mathematics, the entropy influence conjecture is a statement about Boolean functions originally conjectured by Ehud Friedgut and Gil Kalai in 1996.

== Statement ==
For a function $f: \{-1,1\}^n \to \{-1,1\},$ note its Fourier expansion

$$f(x) = \sum_{S \subset [n]} \widehat{f}(S) x_S, \text{ where } x_S = \prod_{i \in S} x_i.$$

The entropy–influence conjecture states that there exists an absolute constant C such that $H(f) \leq C I(f),$ where the total influence $I$ is defined by

$$I(f) = \sum_S |S| \widehat{f}(S)^2,$$

and the entropy $H$ (of the spectrum) is defined by

$$H(f) = - \sum_S \widehat{f}(S)^2 \log \widehat{f}(S)^2 ,$$

(where x log x is taken to be 0 when x = 0).

== See also ==
- Analysis of Boolean functions
