= Mathematical Kangaroo =

International mathematics competition

Mathematical Kangaroo (also known as Kangaroo challenge; French: jeu-concours Kangourou) is an international mathematics competition in over 89 countries. There are six levels of participation, ranging from grade 1 to grade 12. The competition is held annually on the third Thursday of March. The challenge consists of problems in multiple-choice form that are not standard notebook problems and come from a variety of topics. Besides basic computational skills, they require inspiring ideas, perseverance, creativity and imagination, logical thinking, and other problem-solving strategies. Often there are small stories, intriguing problems, and surprising results, which encourage discussions with friends and family.

It had over 6 million participants from 57 countries in 2014. In 2022, it has 84 participants countries and claims to be the largest competition for school students in the world.

== History ==
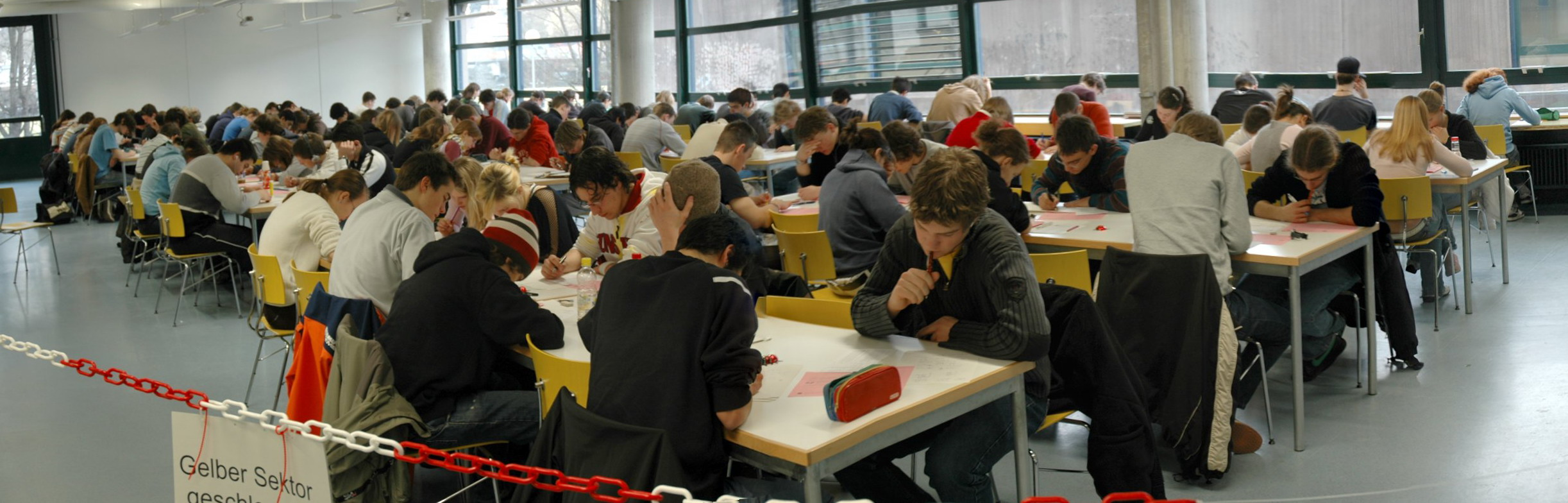
School students during the Kangaroo in Germany in 2006

Mathematicians in Australia came up with the idea to organize a competition that underlines the joy of mathematics and encourages mathematical problem-solving. A multiple-choice competition was created, which has been taking place in Australia since 1978. At the same time, both in France and all over the world, a widely supported movement emerged towards the popularization of mathematics. The idea of a multiple-choice competition then sprouted from two French teachers, André Deledicq and Jean Pierre Boudine, who visited their Australian colleagues Peter O’Halloran and Peter Taylor and witnessed their competition. In 1990, they decided to start a challenge in France under the name Kangourou des Mathématiques in order to pay tribute to their Australian colleagues. The particularity of this challenge was the desire for massive distribution of documentation, offering a gift to each participant (books, small games, fun objects, scientific and cultural trips). The first Kangaroo challenge took place on May 15, 1991. Since it was immediately very successful, shortly afterward they spread the idea in Europe.

In May 1993, three teams of teachers from Romania, Poland and Bulgaria participated in Kangaroo together with France. After that, Kangourou des Mathématiques invited mathematicians and organizers of mathematical competitions from several European countries. All of them were impressed by the increasing number of participants in the Kangaroo challenge in France: 120 000 in 1991, 300 000 in 1992, half a million in 1993. In seven countries – Belarus, Hungary, The Netherlands, Poland, Romania, Russia, and Spain – teams of teachers decided to also organize the contest in 1994. It was a great success in all of these countries. An international competition promoting the dissemination of basic mathematical culture was born.

Since then, the competition has spread around the world. Pupils from Sweden first took part in 1999. By 2011, 860,000 pupils from 9,000 schools took part in Germany, having grown rapidly from 549,000 in 2007. In 2014, the competition was hosted in Latin America. In 2017, the Bulgarian association held a week-long Kangaroo summer camp. In Canada, math contest clubs for elementary school children teach "questions typical of the Math Kangaroo contest", starting with those with a visual component and helping to develop logic and spatial reasoning. Students in Pakistan took part for the first time in 2005, the numbers increasing each year since. In 2009, the Pittsburgh Post-Gazette noted that the competition was very popular in Europe, and was "finding its way into the United States". Denmark first participated in 2015.

== Association Kangourou Sans Frontières ==
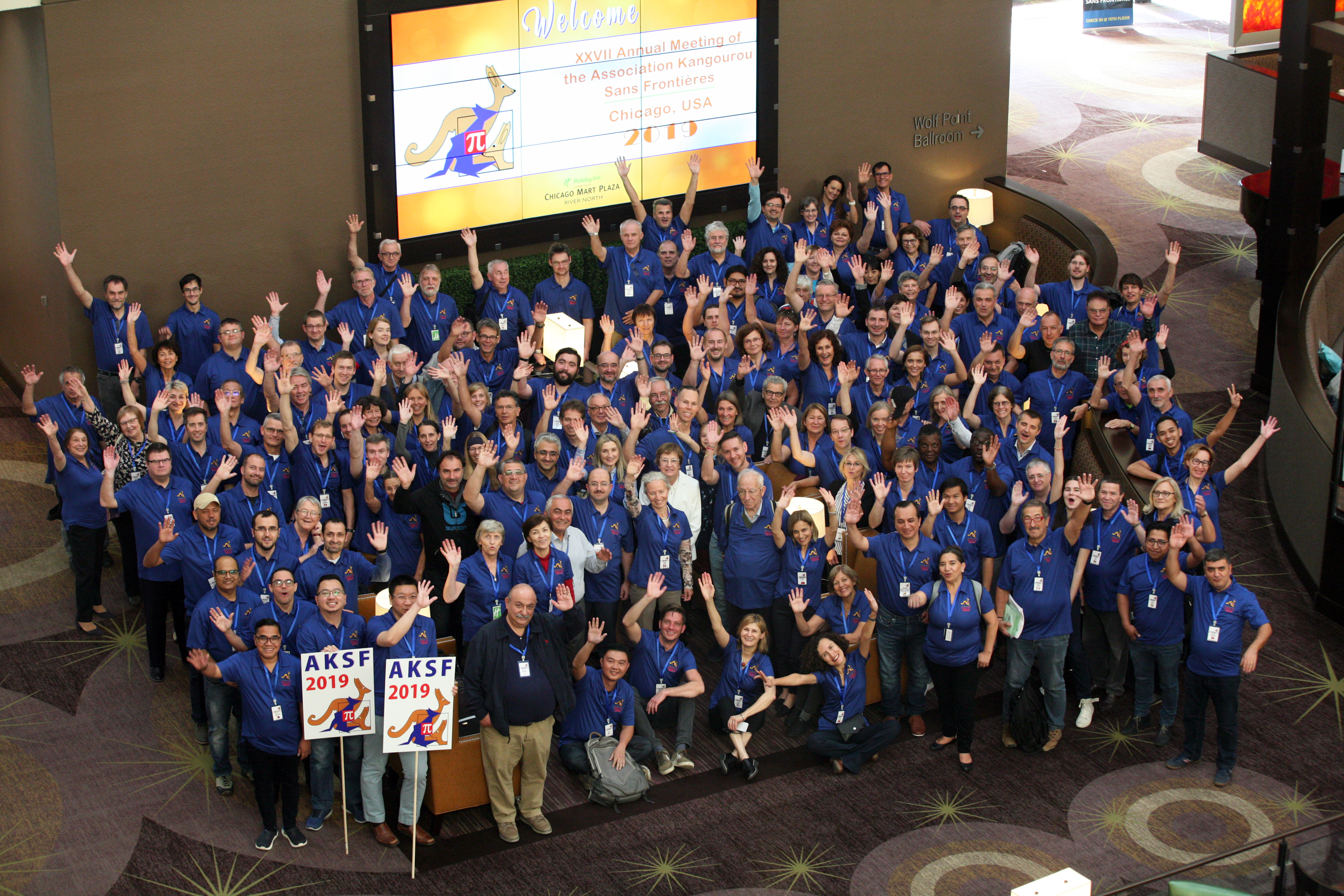
The members of the association Kangourou Sans Frontières at their annual meeting in Chicago in 2019

The association Kangourou sans Frontières (Kangaroo without Borders) is an international association founded in France. Its main activity is designing the annual Kangaroo challenge and managing it on an international level. The organization of the competition in the individual countries is up to the members of Kangourou sans Frontières.

In 1994, mathematicians from 10 countries met in Strasbourg (France) and founded the association Kangourou Sans Frontières with statutes registered in Paris on January 17, 1995. From that day on, Kangaroo has continued to grow. The number of members of the association exceeded 75 countries in 2019 and is still increasing. The systematic growth of the association was accompanied by a growing professionalization and digitalization of the association. The president of the association is Meike Akveld (ETH Zurich, Switzerland).

== Annual meetings ==
Association Kangourou Sans Frontières organizes meetings each year. The oldest meetings are on the top and the newest are on the bottom.

#	Year	Country	City/town	Dates	Members
	1993	France	Paris	May 13–15	0
	1994	France	Strasbourg	June 13–15	10
1	1995	France	Paris	January 14–15	10
2	1995	Poland	Toruń	November 11–12	9
3	1995	Netherlands	Eindhoven	December 9–10	13
4	1996	Poland	Toruń	December 14–15	18
5	1997	Hungary	Budapest	November 6–9	20
6	1998	Slovenia	Ljubljana	November 6–8	23
7	1999	Spain	Valladolid	November 22–24	25
8	2000	Czech Republic	Čelákovice	November 19–22	26
9	2001	Romania	Sinaia	November 8–11	31
10	2002	Italy	Rimini	November 17–20	31
11	2003	France	Paris	November 6–9	34
12	2004	Germany	Berlin	November 13–17	34
13	2005	Bulgaria	Borovets	November 2–6	36
14	2006	Spain	Barcelona	November 11–15	41
15	2007	Austria	Graz	October 18–21	43
16	2008	Germany	Berlin	October 16–19	46
17	2009	Belarus	Minsk	October 29–31	47
18	2010	Georgia	Tbilissi	October 13–16	50
19	2011	Slovenia	Bled	October 19–23	51
20	2012	Cyprus	Protaras	October 31 – November 4	57
21	2013	United Kingdom	Edinburgh	October 31 – November 2	60
22	2014	Puerto Rico	San Juan	November 12–16	61
23	2015	Sweden	Gothenburg	October 14–18	63
24	2016	Ukraine	Lviv	October 26–30	65
25	2017	Switzerland	Luzern	October 11–15	70
26	2018	Lithuania	Vilnius	October 10–14	74
27	2019	United States	Chicago	October 16–20	77
28	2020	Switzerland	virtual due to COVID pandemic	October 14–18	78
29	2021	Belgium	Antwerp	November 3–7	
30	2022	Italy	Cervia	October 5–9	
31	2023	Armenia	Yerevan	TBD	

== Format ==
In all participating countries the challenge is a multiple-choice test. Collecting results, marking, and awarding prizes are regulated and organized nationally. In most countries, the challenge runs for 50 up to 75 minutes. It consists of 24 up to 30 problems. The sections for 3 point-, 4 point-, and 5 point-problems are equally divided. There is a penalty for an incorrect answer and no penalty for skipping a question.

== Research ==
Elisabeth Mellroth has investigated the use of mathematical competencies in the Mathematical Kangaroo.

== See also ==
- List of mathematics competitions
- International Mathematical Olympiad
