= Rita Zemach =

American statistician

Rita B. Zemach
- Born: Rita Dresner; April 3, 1926
- Died: June 8, 2015 (aged 89); Deerfield, Illinois
- Education: Barnard College
- Alma mater: Michigan State University
- Scientific career
- Fields: Statistics
- Workplaces: Michigan Department of Public Health
- Thesis: On Orthogonal Arrays of Strength Four and Their Applications (1965)
- Doctoral advisor: Esther Seiden

Rita B. Zemach (née Dresner; April 3, 1926 – June 8, 2015) was an American statistician who worked for the Michigan Department of Public Health, and helped promote women in statistics.

== Early life and education ==
Rita Dresner started her undergraduate studies at New York University, but transferred to Barnard College in her junior year. At Barnard, she became a member of the editorial staff of the Barnard Bulletin, the school newspaper. She graduated from Barnard in 1947.

== Statistics career ==
As Rita Zemach, she became an elected member of the Institute of Mathematical Statistics in 1961, and earned her Ph.D. in statistics in 1965 from Michigan State University. Her dissertation, supervised by Esther Seiden, was On Orthogonal Arrays of Strength Four and Their Applications. She later published this work, "the first significant progress on orthogonal arrays of strength 4", with Seiden in the Annals of Mathematical Statistics.

Her later research concerned more applied areas of statistics, in health and resource allocation. By 1979, she had become chief of statistics research and education for the Michigan Department of Public Health.

== Recognition ==
Zemach was elected as a Fellow of the American Statistical Association in 1987.
