= Geometric and Functional Analysis =

- Discipline: mathematics
- Language: English
- Edited by: Vitali Milman (editor-in-chief), Simon Donaldson, Mikhail Gromov, Larry Guth, Boáz Klartag, Leonid Polterovich, Peter Sarnak.

Publication details
- History: 1991-present
- Publisher: Birkhauser, Springer-Verlag
- Frequency: Bimonthly
- Impact factor: 2.2 (2022)

Standard abbreviations
- ISO 4: Geom. Funct. Anal.

Indexing
- CODEN: GFANFB
- ISSN: 1016-443X (print); 1420-8970 (web)
- LCCN: 92642625
- OCLC no.: 612537493

Links
- Journal homepage

Geometric and Functional Analysis (GAFA) is a mathematical journal published by Birkhäuser, an independent division of Springer-Verlag. The journal is published bi-monthly.

The journal publishes major results on a broad range of mathematical topics related to geometry and analysis. GAFA is both an acronym and a part of the official full name of the journal.

== History ==
GAFA was founded in 1991 by Mikhail Gromov and Vitali Milman. The idea for the journal was inspired by the long-running Israeli seminar series "Geometric Aspects of Functional Analysis" of which Vitali Milman had been one of the main organizers in the previous years. The journal retained the same acronym as the series to stress the connection between the two.

== Journal information ==
The journal is reviewed cover-to-cover in Mathematical Reviews and zbMATH Open and is indexed cover-to-cover in the Web of Science. According to the Journal Citation Reports, the journal has a 2022 impact factor of 2.2.

The journal has seven editors: Vitali Milman (editor-in-chief), Simon Donaldson, Mikhail Gromov, Larry Guth, Boáz Klartag, Leonid Polterovich, and Peter Sarnak.

== See also ==
- Geometric analysis
