= Jürgen Jost =

German mathematician (born 1956)

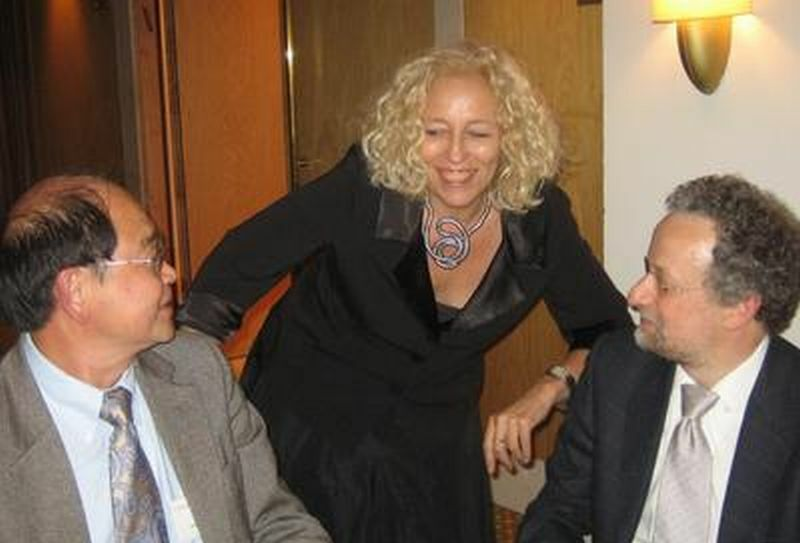
- Jost (right) with Yum-Tong Siu and Mina Teicher in 2008
- Born: 9 June 1956 (age 70); Münster, Germany
- Education: University of Bonn
- Awards: Gottfried Wilhelm Leibniz Prize (1993)
- Scientific career
- Fields: Mathematics
- Workplaces: Max Planck Institute for Mathematics in the Sciences
- Thesis: Eineindeutigkeit harmonischer Abbildungen (1980)
- Doctoral advisor: Stefan Hildebrandt

Jürgen Jost (born 9 June 1956) is a German mathematician specializing in geometry. He has been a director of the Max Planck Institute for Mathematics in the Sciences in Leipzig since 1996.

== Life and work ==
In 1975, he began studying mathematics, physics, economics and philosophy. In 1980 he received a Dr. rer. nat. from the University of Bonn under the supervision of Stefan Hildebrandt. In 1984 he was at the University of Bonn for the habilitation. After his habilitation, he was at the Ruhr University Bochum, the chair of Mathematics X, Analysis. During this time he was the coordinator of the project "Stochastic Analysis and systems with infinitely many degrees of freedom" from July 1987 to December 1996. For this work he received the 1993 Gottfried Wilhelm Leibniz Prize, awarded by the Deutsche Forschungsgemeinschaft.

Since 1996, he has been director and scientific member at the Max Planck Institute for Mathematics in the Sciences in Leipzig, having left Bochum after more than 10 years of work there, to "tackle new research problems in the border area between mathematics and the natural sciences and simultaneously encourage mathematical research in Germany, particularly in the fields of geometry and analysis."

In 1998 he was an honorary professor at the University of Leipzig. In 2002, there, he initiated with two other scientists from the Max Planck Institute, the Interdisciplinary Center for Bioinformatics (IZBI).

In 1986 he was invited speaker at the International Congress of Mathematicians in Berkeley (Two dimensional geometric variational problems). He is a fellow of the American Mathematical Society.

His research focuses are:

- Complex dynamical systems
- Neural networks
- Cognitive structures and theoretical neurobiology, cognitive science, theoretical and mathematical biology
- Riemannian geometry; analysis and geometry
- Calculus of variations and partial differential equations; mathematical physics

== Bibliography ==
- Jost, Jürgen (1983). Harmonic mappings between Riemannian manifolds. Canberra: Centre for Mathematical Analysis, Australian National University. ISBN 0-86784-403-5. OCLC 13282393.
- Jost, Jürgen (1984). "Harmonic Maps Between Surfaces (with a Special Chapter on Conformal Mappings)". Lecture Notes in Mathematics. Vol. 1062. Berlin, Heidelberg: Springer Berlin Heidelberg. doi:10.1007/bfb0100160. ISBN 978-3-540-13339-1. ISSN 0075-8434.
- Jost, Jürgen (1988). Nonlinear Methods in Riemannian and Kählerian Geometry : Delivered at the German Mathematical Society Seminar in Düsseldorf in June, 1986. Basel: Birkhäuser Basel Imprint Birkhäuser. ISBN 978-3-0348-7690-2. OCLC 851812426.
- Jost, Jürgen (1991). Two-dimensional geometric variational problems. Chichester New York: Wiley. ISBN 978-0-471-92839-3. OCLC 21672946.
- Differentialgeometrie und Minimalflächen. Berlin, Heidelberg: Springer Berlin Heidelberg. 2007. doi:10.1007/978-3-540-68293-6. ISBN 978-3-540-22227-9.
- Jost, Jürgen (2017). Riemannian geometry and geometric analysis. Cham, Switzerland: Springer. ISBN 978-3-319-61859-3. OCLC 1007152776.
- Jost, Jürgen (2006). Compact Riemann Surfaces. Berlin, Heidelberg: Springer Berlin Heidelberg. doi:10.1007/978-3-540-33067-7. ISBN 978-3-540-33065-3.
- Jost, Jürgen (2005). Postmodern analysis. Berlin: Springer. ISBN 978-3-540-25830-8. OCLC 209870644.
- Albeverio, Sergio (1997). A mathematical introduction to string theory : variational problems, geometric and probabilistic methods. Cambridge New York: Cambridge University Press. ISBN 978-0-521-55610-1. OCLC 836871453.
- Jost, Jürgen; Li-Jost, Xianqing (1998). Calculus of variations. Cambridge, UK New York: Cambridge University Press. ISBN 978-0-521-05712-7. OCLC 39658898.
- Jost, Jürgen (1997). Nonpositive curvature : geometric and analytic aspects. Basel Boston: Birkhäuser. ISBN 978-3-7643-5736-8. OCLC 36761646.
- Jost, Jürgen (1998). Partielle Differentialgleichungen. Berlin, Heidelberg: Springer Berlin Heidelberg. doi:10.1007/978-3-642-58888-4. ISBN 978-3-540-64222-0.
- Bosonic Strings: A mathematical treatment, AMS international press, 2001
- Jost, Jürgen (2013). "Partial Differential Equations". Graduate Texts in Mathematics. Vol. 214. New York, NY: Springer New York. doi:10.1007/978-1-4614-4809-9. ISBN 978-1-4614-4808-2. ISSN 0072-5285.
- Jost, Jürgen (2005). Dynamical systems : examples of complex behaviour. Berlin New York: Springer. ISBN 978-3-540-22908-7. OCLC 209861174.
- Jost, Jürgen (2009). Geometry and physics. Berlin London: Springer. ISBN 978-3-642-00540-4. OCLC 489215723.
- Ay, Nihat; Jost, Jürgen; Lê, Hông Vân; Schwachhöfer, Lorenz (2017). Information geometry. Cham. ISBN 978-3-319-56477-7. OCLC 1007533823.
