= Vitali Milman =

Ukrainian-Israeli mathematician (born 1939)

- ויטלי מילמן
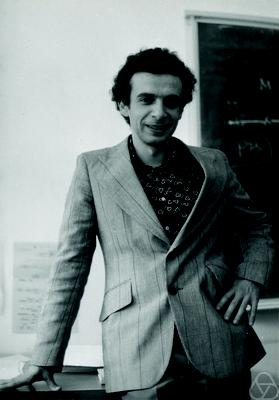
- Born: 23 August 1939 (age 87); Odessa, Ukrainian SSR, Soviet Union
- Education: Kharkiv State University
- Awards: EMET Prize (2007); Israel Prize (2024)
- Scientific career
- Fields: Mathematics
- Workplaces: Tel Aviv University
- Doctoral advisor: Boris Levin
- Doctoral students: Semyon Alesker; Shiri Artstein; Bo'az Klartag; Leonid Polterovich; Ronen Eldan

Vitali Davidovich Milman (Hebrew: ויטלי מילמן; Russian: Виталий Давидович Мильман) (born 23 August 1939) is a mathematician specializing in analysis. He is a professor at the Tel Aviv University. In the past he was a President of the Israel Mathematical Union and a member of the “Aliyah” committee of Tel Aviv University. He is the recipient of the 2024 Israel Prize in the field of mathematics and computer science.

== Work ==
Milman received his Ph.D. at Kharkiv State University in 1965 under the direction of Boris Levin.

In a 1971 paper, Milman gave a new proof of Dvoretzky's theorem, stating that every convex body in dimension N has a section of dimension d(N), with d(N) tending to infinity with N, that is arbitrarily close to being isometric to an ellipsoid. Milman's proof gives the optimal bound d(N) ≥ const log N. In this proof, Milman put forth the concentration of measure phenomenon which has since found numerous applications.

Milman made important contributions to the study of Banach spaces of large (finite) dimension, which led to the development of asymptotic geometric analysis. His results in this field include Milman's reverse Brunn–Minkowski inequality and the quotient of subspace theorem.

== Positions ==
He holds several positions including being the advisor to the Israel Ministry of Science on the immigration of scientists, and being a member of the European Mathematical Union.

He is on the editorial boards of several journals, including Geometric and Functional Analysis. He has published over 150 scientific publications, a monograph and eleven edited books. He has delivered lectures at Universities such as MIT, IAS Princeton, Berkeley, IHES Paris, Cambridge.

== Awards and honors ==
Milman was an Invited Speaker of the International Congress of Mathematicians in 1986 in Berkeley and in 1998 in Berlin. He received the Landau Prize in Mathematics in 2002 and the EMET Prize in mathematics in 2007. He was selected to receive the Israel Prize in mathematics in 2024.

In 2012 he became a fellow of the American Mathematical Society.

== Family ==
Mathematics runs in the Milman family. His father is the mathematician David Milman, who devised the Krein–Milman theorem. His brother is the mathematician Pierre Milman and his son is the young mathematician Emanuel Milman.

== Selected works ==
- Artstein, Shiri; Giannopoulos, Apostolos; Milman, Vitali (2015). Asymptotic Geometric Analysis, Part I. Mathematical Surveys and Monographs. Vol. 202. American Mathematical Society..
