= Leonid Polterovich =

Russian-Israeli mathematician

- 'לאוניד פולטרוביץ
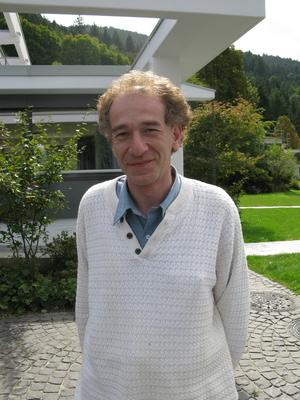
- Born: 30 August 1963 (age 63); Moscow, USSR
- Education: Moscow State University (1984); Tel Aviv University
- Awards: Erdős Prize (1998); EMS Prize (1996)
- Scientific career
- Fields: Mathematics
- Workplaces: Tel Aviv University; University of Chicago
- Doctoral advisor: Yakov G. Sinai; Vitali Milman
- Doctoral students: Meike Akveld; Paul Biran

Leonid Viktorovich Polterovich (Hebrew: לאוניד פולטרוביץ'; Russian: Леонид В. Полтерович; born 30 August 1963) is a Russian-Israeli mathematician at Tel Aviv University. His research field includes symplectic geometry and dynamical systems.

A native of Moscow, Polterovich earned his undergraduate degree at Moscow State University in 1984. He moved to Israel after the collapse of communism, earning his doctorate from Tel Aviv University in 1990. In 1996, he was awarded the EMS Prize, in 1998 the Erdős Prize, and in 2003 the Michael Bruno Memorial Award by Yad Hanadiv. In 1998, he was an invited speaker of the International Congress of Mathematicians in Berlin. In 2016, he gave a plenary lecture at the 7th European Congress of Mathematics in Berlin. He was a member of the faculty of the University of Chicago.

He was elected to the Academia Europaea in 2024.

His brother, Iosif Polterovich, is a professor of mathematics at the University of Montreal.
