= Gil Kalai =

Israeli mathematician and computer scientist

- גיל קלעי
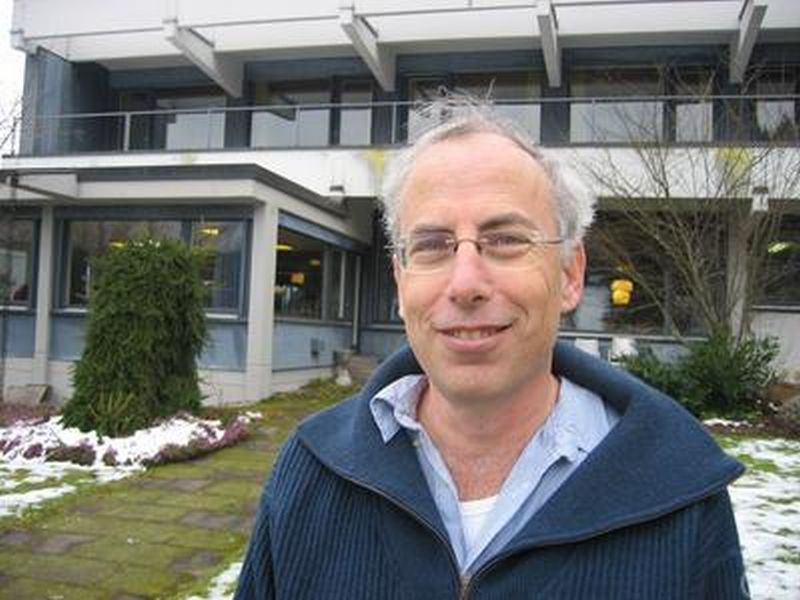
- Kalai at Oberwolfach, 2007
- Born: 1955 (age 70–71)
- Education: Hebrew University (PhD)
- Scientific career
- Fields: Mathematics
- Workplaces: Hebrew University of Jerusalem; Yale University
- Doctoral advisor: Micha Perles
- Notable students: Isabella Novik

Gil Kalai (Hebrew: גיל קלעי; born 1955) is an Israeli mathematician and computer scientist. He is the Henry and Manya Noskwith Professor Emeritus of Mathematics at the Hebrew University of Jerusalem, professor of computer science at the Interdisciplinary Center, Herzliya, and adjunct professor of mathematics and of computer science at Yale University, United States.

== Biography ==
Kalai was born in 1955 in Tel Aviv. He is the son of Hanoch Kalai, who was a leader of Irgun and co-founder of Lehi. He received his PhD from Hebrew University in 1983 advised by Micha Perles, and held a postdoctoral position at the Massachusetts Institute of Technology. He joined the Hebrew University faculty in 1985, where he has remained since.

From 1995 to 2001, he was the editor-in-chief of the Israel Journal of Mathematics. In 2016, he was elected honorary member of the Hungarian Academy of Sciences. In 2018 he was a plenary speaker with talk Noise Stability, Noise Sensitivity and the Quantum Computer Puzzle at the International Congress of Mathematicians in Rio de Janeiro.

== Research ==
Kalai is known for finding variants of the simplex algorithm in linear programming that can be proven to run in subexponential time, for showing that every monotone property of graphs has a sharp phase transition, for solving Borsuk's problem on the number of pieces needed to partition convex sets into subsets of smaller diameter, and for his work on the Hirsch conjecture on the diameter of convex polytopes and in polyhedral combinatorics more generally.

=== Quantum computing skepticism and conjectures ===
Kalai is a noted skeptic of quantum computing and argues that true quantum computing, which would give exponential speedups over classical computing, cannot be achieved because of inherent limitations when trying to implement quantum error correction experimentally. He has engaged in a series of public debates with quantum computing researcher Aram Harrow on his blog, and has formalized his argument by stating a series of conjectures. Harrow and Steven Flammia published a preprint on arXiv in 2012 claiming to refute Kalai's Conjecture C, although Kalai later argued in 2022 that there were flaws in their argument. In 2025, Kalai publicly debated quantum computing researcher Matthias Christandl at the Learned Society of the Czech Republic on whether true quantum computing had already been achieved.

Kalai's conjectures are stated as follows:

Conjecture 1 (No quantum error correction). The process for creating a quantum error-correcting code will necessarily lead to a mixture of the desired codewords with undesired codewords. The probability of the undesired codewords is uniformly bounded away from zero. (In every implementation of quantum error-correcting codes with one encoded qubit, the probability of not getting the intended qubit is at least some δ > 0, independently of the number of qubits used for encoding.)

Conjecture 2. A noisy quantum computer is subject to noise in which information leaks for two substantially entangled qubits have a substantial positive correlation.

Conjecture 3. In any quantum computer at a highly entangled state there will be a strong effect of error-synchronization.

Conjecture 4. Noisy quantum processes are subject to detrimental noise.

== Recognition ==
Kalai was the recipient of the Pólya Prize in 1992, the Erdős Prize of the Israel Mathematical Society in 1993, and the Fulkerson Prize in 1994. He was also the winner of the 2012 Rothschild Prize in mathematics. He was named to the 2023 class of Fellows of the American Mathematical Society, "for contributions to combinatorics, convexity, and their applications, as well as to the exposition and communication of mathematics".

== See also ==
- Kalai's 3^{d} conjecture
- Entropy influence conjecture
