= Mina Teicher =

Israeli mathematician

- מינה טייכר
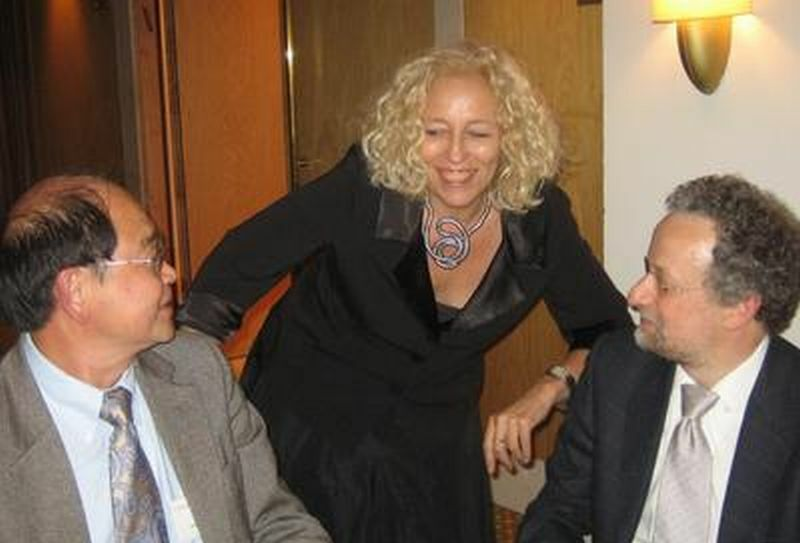
- Mina Teicher (middle) with Yum-Tong Siu (left) and Jürgen Jost (right), 2008
- Education: Tel Aviv University
- Known for: Algebraic geometry, Leadership roles in academia and science
- Scientific career
- Fields: Algebraic geometry
- Workplaces: Bar-Ilan University
- Doctoral advisor: Ilya Piatetski-Shapiro

Mina Teicher (Hebrew: מינה טייכר) is an Israeli mathematician at Bar-Ilan University, specializing in algebraic geometry.

Teicher earned bachelor's, masters, and doctoral degrees from Tel Aviv University in 1974, 1976, and 1981 respectively. Her dissertation, Birational Transformation Between 4-folds, was supervised by Ilya Piatetski-Shapiro. Since 1999, she has directed the Emmy Noether Research Institute for Mathematics at Bar-Ilan University. In 2001–2002 she was the inaugural Emmy Noether Visiting professor at the University of Göttingen, where she lectured about braid groups.

She has held leadership roles in academia and science, including serving from 2005 to 2007 as chief scientist at Israel's Ministry of Science and Technology, and chairing the board of governors of the United States – Israel Binational Science Foundation from 2012 to 2013.
