= Journal d'Analyse Mathématique =

- Discipline: Mathematics
- Language: English, French
- Edited by: Jonathan Breuer

Publication details
- History: 1951–present
- Publisher: Springer Science+Business Media on behalf of Magnes Press (Hebrew University of Jerusalem)
- Frequency: Triannually
- Impact factor: 1.0 (2022)

Standard abbreviations
- ISO 4: J. Anal. Math.
- MathSciNet: J. Anal. Math.

Indexing
- ISSN: 0021-7670 (print); 1565-8538 (web)
- LCCN: 2013250505
- OCLC no.: 859638202

Links
- Journal homepage; Online archive

The Journal d'Analyse Mathématique is a triannual peer-reviewed scientific journal published by Springer Science+Business Media on behalf of Magnes Press (Hebrew University of Jerusalem). It was established in 1951 by Binyamin Amirà.

The journal covers research in mathematics, especially classical analysis and related areas such as complex function theory, ergodic theory, functional analysis, harmonic analysis, partial differential equations, and quasiconformal mapping.

== Abstracting and indexing ==
The journal is abstracted and indexed in

- MathSciNet
- Science Citation Index Expanded
- Scopus
- ZbMATH Open

According to the Journal Citation Reports, the journal has a 2022 impact factor of 1.0.
