= Shaul Foguel =

Israeli mathematician (1931–2020)

Shaul Reuven Foguel
- שאול פוגל
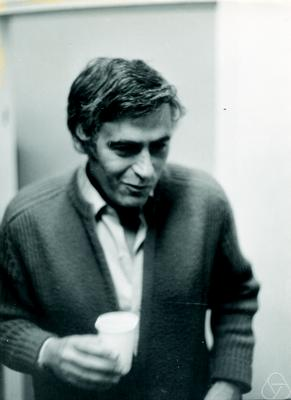
- Born: December 5, 1931; Tel Aviv, Mandatory Palestine
- Died: December 19, 2020 (aged 89); New York City, USA
- Education: Hebrew University of Jerusalem, Yale University
- Known for: Studies in Spectral Operators and the Basis Problem
- Scientific career
- Fields: Mathematics
- Workplaces: Hebrew University of Jerusalem
- Doctoral advisor: Nelson Dunford

Shaul Reuven Foguel (Hebrew: שאול פוגל, December 5, 1931 - December 19, 2020) was an Israeli mathematician. Shaul Foguel was born to one of the founding families of the City of Tel Aviv and his mother Dora Malkin was a direct descendant of Saul Wahl. He received his B.S. and M.S. in Mathematics from the Hebrew University of Jerusalem and his PhD in Mathematics from Yale University in 1958. He wrote his dissertation under Nelson Dunford on "Studies in Spectral Operators and the Basis Problem". Shaul Foguel was Professor Emeritus of the Hebrew University of Jerusalem, and a supporter of the Israeli Left. He ran in the 1969 Knesset elections on the Peace List along with Gadi Yatziv, although it failed to win a seat. He spent his retirement in New York City, where his two sons, Professor Tuval Foguel of Adelphi University, and Sy Foguel, the CEO of Berkshire Hathaway GUARD Insurance Companies live.

== Publications ==
- Shaul R. Foguel "Selected topics in the study of Markov operators" Dept. of Mathematics, University of North Carolina at Chapel Hill, 1980
- Shaul R. Foguel "The Ergodic theory of Markov processes" Van Nostrand Reinhold Co., 1969

== Selected articles ==
- Foguel, Shaul R. (1983). "A generalized 0–2 law". Israel Journal of Mathematics. 45 (2): 219–224. doi:10.1007/BF02774018.
- Foguel, Shaul R. (1979). "Harris operators". Israel Journal of Mathematics. 33 (3): 281–309. doi:10.1007/BF02762166.
- Foguel, Shaul R. (1979). "Shlomo Horowitz 1938–1978". Israel Journal of Mathematics. 33 (3): 175–176. doi:10.1007/BF02762158.
- Foguel, Shaul R. (1976). "More on the "Zero-Two" Law". Proceedings of the American Mathematical Society. 61 (2): 262–264. doi:10.1090/S0002-9939-1976-0428076-2.
