= Avraham Agmon =

Israeli politician

- אברהם אגמון
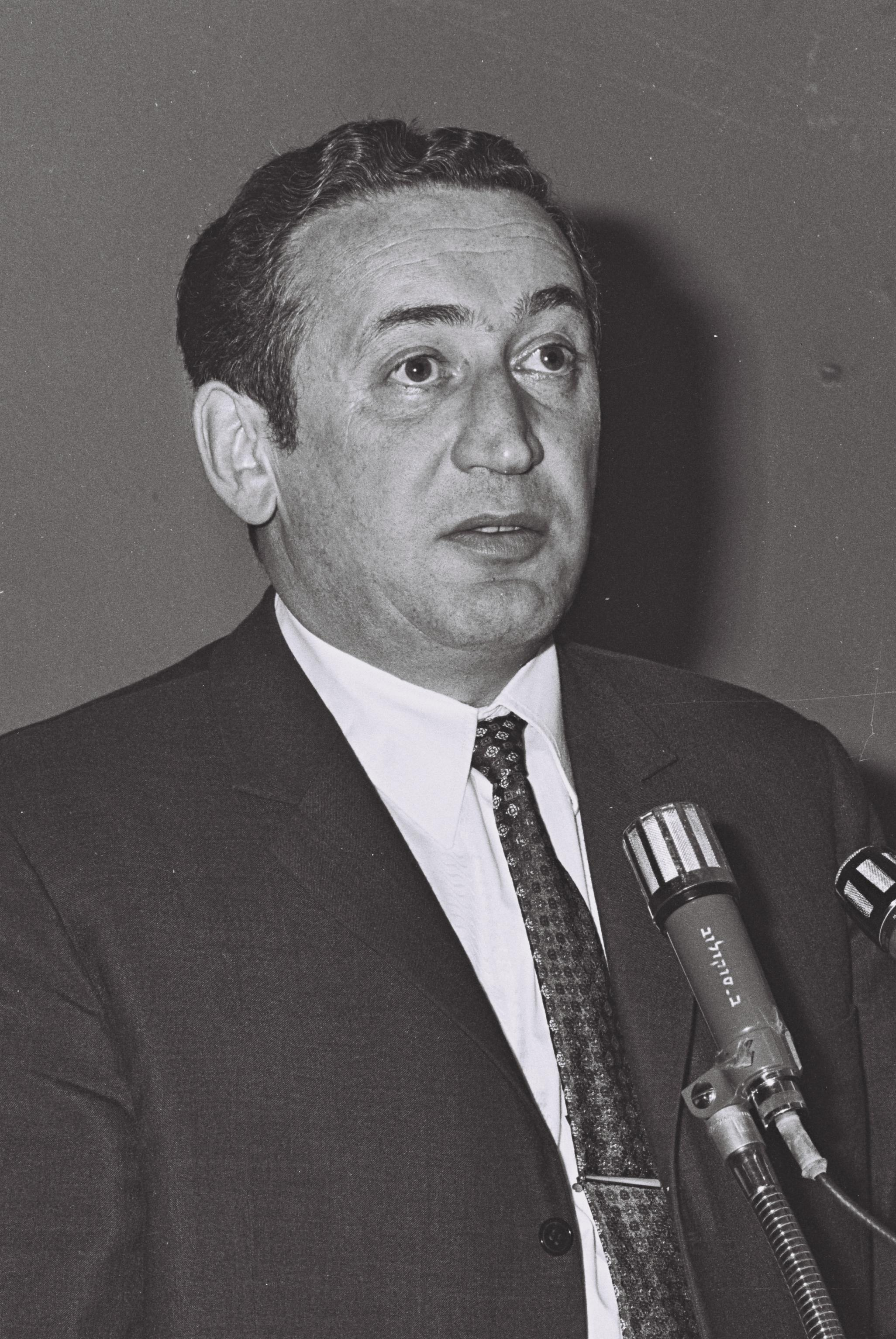
- Avraham Agmon in 1970
- Born: 11 September 1928; Białystok, Poland
- Died: 21 December 1992 (aged 64)
- Occupations: Diplomat and economist

Avraham Agmon (Hebrew: אברהם אגמון; 1928–1992) was an Israeli diplomat and economist.

He was born in Białystok, Poland, immigrated to Palestine in 1947, and fought in the 1947–1949 war with the Givati Brigade. As a student he was chairman of the national student union in 1953–1954.

In 1956 Agmon was appointed to his first diplomatic post, serving under Nativ in Moscow. Between 1958 and 1960 he worked at the Ministry of Finance in Jerusalem and later sent as First Secretary to the Israeli embassy in the Soviet Union, until 1964.

Between 1968 and 1970 he headed the Budgets Directorate and later appointed as Director General of the Ministry of Finance, serving in that position until 1975.

From 1976 to 1992 he was head of the Delek corporation.

== See also ==
- Meir Ezri
