= Micha Lindenstrauss =

Israeli judge (1937–2019)

- מיכה לינדנשטראוס
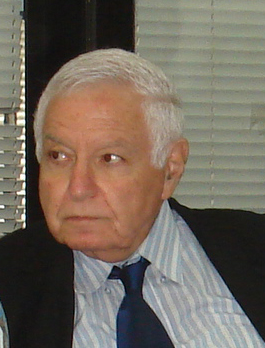

State Comptroller of Israel

Personal details
- Born: June 28, 1937 Germany
- Died: May 2, 2019 (aged 81) Israel

Micha Lindenstrauss (Hebrew: מיכה לינדנשטראוס; 28 June 1937 – 2 May 2019) was an Israeli judge and the State Comptroller of Israel between 2005 and 2012.

== Biography ==
Micha Lindenstrauss was born in Berlin, Germany. His family immigrated to Mandatory Palestine when he was two years old, on the eve of World War II. He studied law at the Hebrew University of Jerusalem. He was married and a father to three daughters, one of whom is a judge. His cousin Joram Lindenstrauss was an Israeli mathematician and one of his distant relatives, the Israeli mathematician Elon Lindenstrauss is a Fields Medalist.

== Judicial career ==
In the Israel Defense Forces, he served as a military prosecutor, and later, as a judge in a military tribunal.

In 1972, he became a Traffic Court judge, and then a Lower District Court judge in Haifa. In 1999, he was appointed president of the Haifa District Court. Later, he became chair of the Judges Delegation of Israel. Lindenstrauss acquitted the suspects in the gang rape of a fourteen-year-old girl in kibbutz Shimrat, a decision overturned by the Supreme Court. As chair of the Judges Delegation, he became known for his opposition to the abolition of the Judges Feedback by the Lawyers Guild of Israel, and helped lead the judges boycott against the Guild incident.

== State comptroller ==
Upon the retirement of State Comptroller Eliezer Goldberg, Lindenstrauss was the sole contender for the position. He was voted as State Comptroller by the Knesset (with 59 voting for, 29 against), a position he assumed in July 2005.

In May 2006, Lindenstrauss became involved in dispute with Public Service Commissioner, Shmuel Hollander, who maintained Lindenstrauss's annual Comptroller report was unfairly and personally biased toward him, resulting in legal action.

In April 2011 Lindenstrauss announced an investigation into Benjamin Netanyahu's travel at the expense of private businessmen, mainly American Jews.
