= David Agmon =

Israeli general

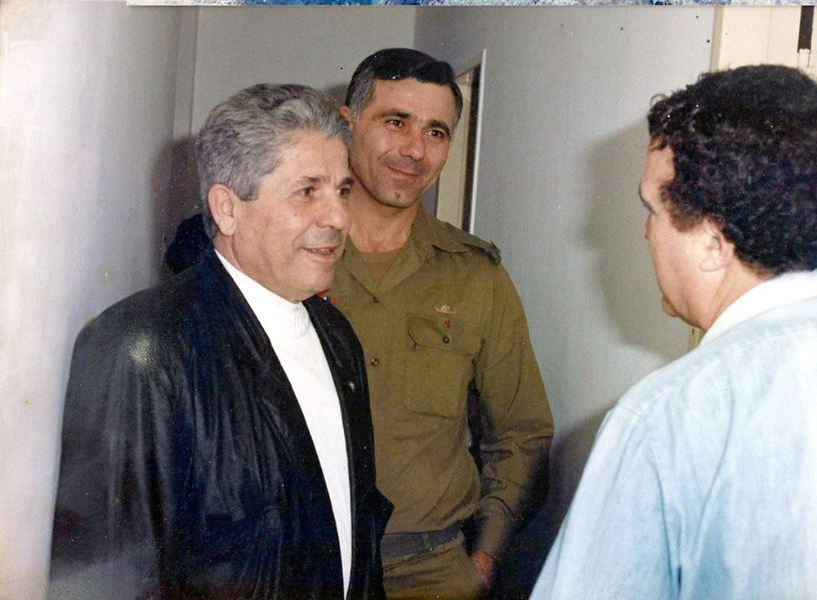
- Native name: דוד אגמון
- Born: David Agmon; 1947 (age 78–79)
- Allegiance: Israel
- Branch: Israel Defense Forces
- Rank: Brigadier general
- Conflicts: Six-Day War
- Spouse: Eva
- Children: 3

David Agmon (Hebrew: דוד אגמון; born 1947) was a brigadier general in the Israel Defense Forces. Following his time in the IDF, Agmon served briefly as bureau chief for Israeli Prime Minister Benjamin Netanyahu.

Born in 1947 in Casablanca, Morocco, David moved to Israel when he was one year old. He joined the Israeli Defense Force in 1965. He was a young officer during the Six-Day War. He was then assigned to Congo for a two-year period to train Congolese soldiers. Later in his career, among other roles, he was the IDF's Chief Infantry Officer and the commander-in-chief of the Southern Lebanese region.

Agmon has written numerous commentaries in various Israeli newspapers and magazines on subjects such as the Arab–Israeli conflict and the Israeli–Palestinian conflict.

Since 2005, David Agmon has been the founder and CEO of Thermosiv Ltd., a start-up company focused on heating systems.

David Agmon is married to Eva, the head of the ADI Flamenco Foundation. He lost one daughter, Adi, during her service in the IDF in 1993. He has two other daughters, Shira, 33, and Dana, 30.
