= Erdős Prize =

Anna and Lajos Erdős Prize in Mathematics
- Awarded for: mathematics and computer science
- Country: Israel
- Presented by: Israel Mathematical Union
- First award: 1977; 49 years ago
- Website: https://www.imu.org.il/erdos-prize

The Anna and Lajos Erdős Prize in Mathematics is a prize given by the Israel Mathematical Union to an Israeli mathematician (in any field of mathematics and computer science), "with preference to candidates up to the age of 40." The prize was established by Paul Erdős in 1977 in honor of his parents, and is awarded annually or biannually. The name was changed from "Erdős Prize" to "Anna and Lajos Erdős Prize in Mathematics" in 1996, after Erdős's death, to reflect his original wishes.

== Erdős Prize recipients ==
- Saharon Shelah (1977)
- Ilya Rips (1979)
- Ofer Gabber (1981)
- Adi Shamir (1983)
- Shmuel Kiro (1985)
- Yosef Yomdin (1987)
- Noga Alon (1989)
- Alexander Lubotzky (1990)
- Gil Kalai (1992)
- Ehud Hrushovski (1994)
- Oded Schramm (1996)
- Leonid Polterovich (1998)
- Shahar Mozes (2000)
- Zeev Rudnick (2001)
- Ran Raz (2002)
- Zlil Sela (2003)
- Semyon Alesker (2004)
- Paul Biran (2006)
- Yehuda Shalom (2007)
- Gady Kozma (2008)
- Elon Lindenstrauss (2009)
- Boaz Klartag (2010)
- Tamar Ziegler (2011)
- Irit Dinur (2012)
- Omri Sarig (2013)
- Eran Nevo (2014)
- Mike Hochman (2015)
- Shiri Artstein-Avidan (2015)
- Emanuel Milman (2016)
- Nir Lev (2017)
- Ronen Eldan (2018)
- Lev Buhovski (2019)
- Doron Puder (2020)
- Nathan Keller (2020)
- Avraham Aizenbud (2021)
- Wojciech Samotij (2022)
- Tomer Schlank (2022)
- Gal Binyamini (2023)
- Amir Abboud (2024)

== See also ==
- List of things named after Paul Erdős
- List of mathematics awards
