= Joram Lindenstrauss =

Israeli mathematician

- יורם לינדנשטראוס
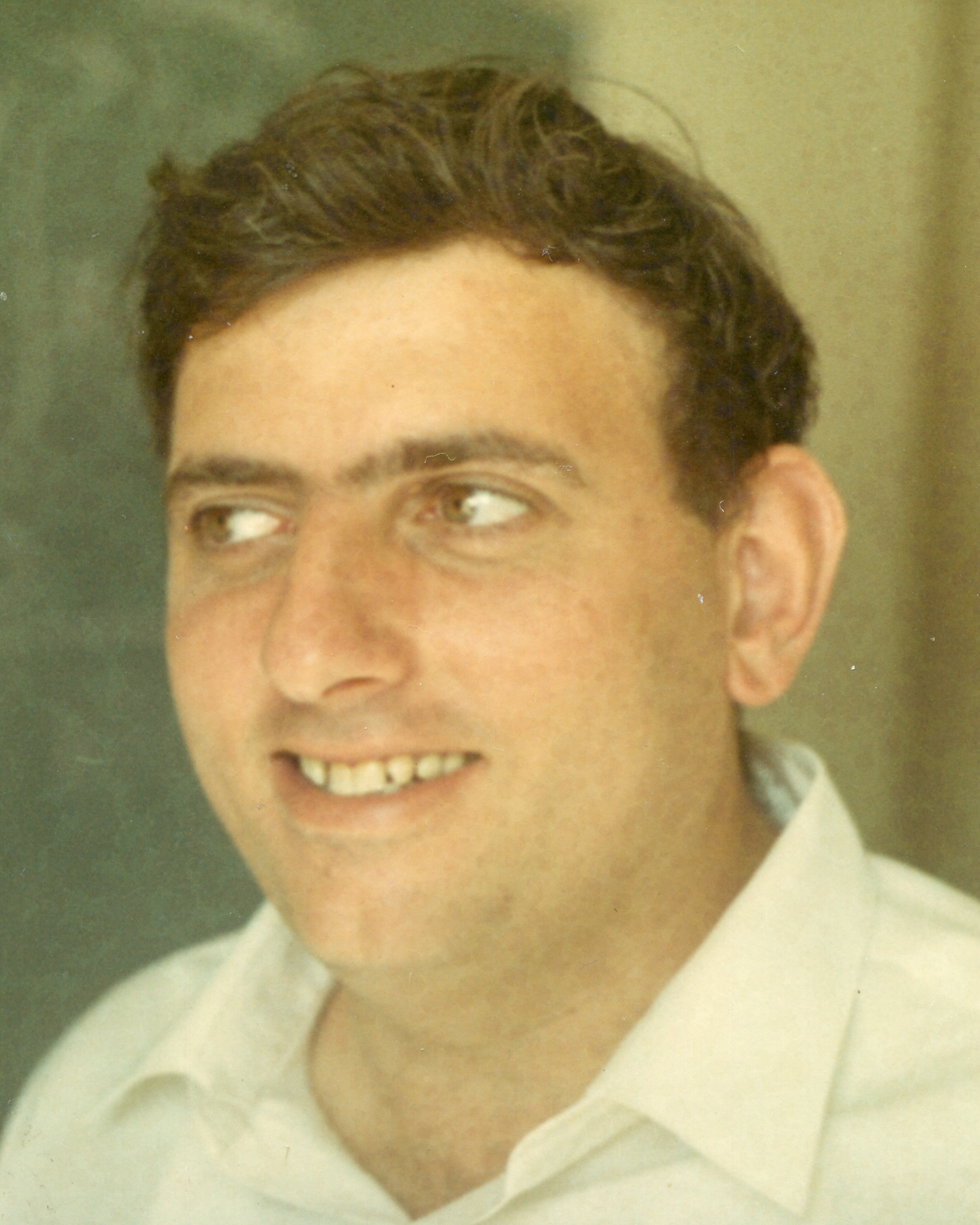
- Lindenstrauss in 1968
- Born: October 28, 1936; Tel Aviv, Mandatory Palestine
- Died: April 29, 2012 (aged 75); Jerusalem, Israel
- Resting place: Har HaMenuchot
- Education: Hebrew University of Jerusalem
- Awards: Israel Prize (1981)
- Scientific career
- Workplaces: Einstein Institute of Mathematics
- Doctoral advisors: Aryeh Dvoretzky; Branko Grünbaum
- Doctoral students: Assaf Naor, Gideon Schechtman

Joram Lindenstrauss (Hebrew: יורם לינדנשטראוס; October 28, 1936 – April 29, 2012) was an Israeli mathematician working in functional analysis. He was a professor of mathematics at the Einstein Institute of Mathematics.

== Biography ==
Joram Lindenstrauss was born in Tel Aviv. He was the only child of a pair of lawyers who immigrated to Israel from Berlin. He began to study mathematics at the Hebrew University of Jerusalem in 1954 while serving in the army. He became a full-time student in 1956 and received his master's degree in 1959. In 1962 Lindenstrauss earned his Ph.D. from the Hebrew University (dissertation: Extension of Compact Operators, advisors: Aryeh Dvoretzky, Branko Grünbaum). He worked as a postdoc at Yale University and the University of Washington in Seattle from 1962 - 1965. He was appointed senior lecturer at the Hebrew University in 1965, associate professor on 1967 and full professor in 1969. He became the Leon H. and Ada G. Miller Memorial Professor of Mathematics in 1985. He retired in 2005.

Lindenstrauss was married to theoretical computer scientist Naomi Lindenstrauss. Two of their children, Ayelet Lindenstrauss and Fields Medallist Elon Lindenstrauss, are also mathematicians (providing a rare example of father, mother, son and daughter all having papers listed in Mathematical Reviews). Joram was also the cousin of Micha Lindenstrauss.

== Research ==
Lindenstrauss worked in various areas of functional analysis and geometry, particularly Banach space theory, finite- and infinite-dimensional convexity, geometric nonlinear functional analysis and geometric measure theory. He authored more than 100 papers as well as several books in Banach space theory.

Among his results is the Johnson–Lindenstrauss lemma which concerns low-distortion embeddings of points from high-dimensional into low-dimensional Euclidean space. Another of his theorems states that in a Banach space with the Radon–Nikodym property, a closed and bounded set has an extreme point; compactness is not needed.

== Awards ==
In 1981 Lindenstrauss was awarded the Israel Prize, for mathematics. In 1997, Lindenstrauss was the first mathematician from outside Poland to be awarded the Stefan Banach Medal of the Polish Academy of Sciences.

== Published works ==
- Classical Banach spaces I (with Lior Tzafriri). Springer-Verlag, 1977.
- Classical Banach spaces II (with Lior Tzafriri). Springer-Verlag, 1979.
- Banach spaces with a unique unconditional basis, up to permutation (with Jean Bourgain, Peter George Casazza, and Lior Tzafriri). Memoirs of the American Mathematical Society, vol 322. American Mathematical Society, 1985
- Geometric nonlinear functional analysis (with Yoav Benyamini). Colloquium publications, 48. American Mathematical Society, 2000.
- Handbook of the geometry of Banach spaces (Edited, with William B. Johnson). Elsevier, Vol. 1 (2001), Vol. 2 (2003).

== See also ==
- List of Israel Prize recipients
- List of second-generation Mathematicians
