= Aryeh Dvoretzky =

Israeli mathematician (1916–2008)

- אריה דבורצקי
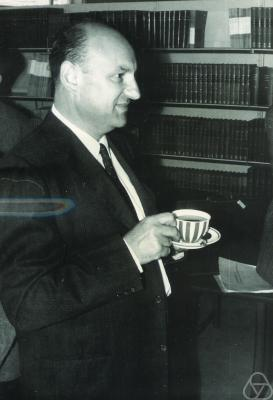
- Aryeh Dvoretzky, 1962
- Born: May 3, 1916; Khorol, Imperial Russia
- Died: May 8, 2008 (aged 92); Jerusalem, Israel
- Education: Hebrew University of Jerusalem
- Known for: Dvoretzky's theorem Dvoretzky's theorem in stochastic approximation Dvoretzky–Kiefer–Wolfowitz inequality Dvoretzky–Rogers theorem eighth president of the Weizmann Institute of Science
- Awards: 1952 Weizmann Prize; 1973 Israel Prize in Mathematics
- Scientific career
- Fields: Mathematics
- Workplaces: Hebrew University of Jerusalem
- Doctoral advisor: Michael Fekete
- Doctoral students: Shmuel Gal; Branko Grünbaum; Joram Lindenstrauss

Aryeh (Arie) Dvoretzky (Hebrew: אריה דבורצקי, Russian: Арье Дворецкий; May 3, 1916 – May 8, 2008) was a Ukrainian-born Israeli mathematician, the winner of the 1973 Israel Prize in Mathematics. He is best known for his work in functional analysis, statistics and probability. He was the eighth president of the Weizmann Institute of Science.

== Biography ==
Aryeh Dvoretzky was born in Khorol, Imperial Russia (now Ukraine). His family immigrated to Palestine in 1922. He graduated from the Hebrew Reali School in Haifa in 1933, and received his Ph.D. at the Hebrew University of Jerusalem in 1941. His advisor was Michael Fekete. He continued working in Jerusalem, becoming a full professor in 1951, the first graduate of the Hebrew University to achieve this distinction. Dvoretzky's son Gideon was killed in the 1973 Yom Kippur War.

== Academic career ==
Dvoretzky had visiting appointments at a number of universities, including Collège de France, Columbia University, Purdue University, Stanford University, and the University of California, Berkeley. He also visited twice the Institute for Advanced Study in Princeton (in 1948–1950 and in 1957–1958). In 1975, he founded the Institute for Advanced Studies of Jerusalem based on the Princeton IAS model. Dvoretzky was the Dean of the Faculty of Sciences (1955–1956) and Vice President of the Hebrew University (1959–1961). He was elected president of the Israel Academy of Sciences and Humanities (1974–1980) and became the eighth president of the Weizmann Institute of Science (1986–1989). He was awarded an honorary doctorate from Tel Aviv University in 1996. Dvoretzky's students included Branko Grünbaum and Joram Lindenstrauss.

== Business and civic career ==
In 1960, he became the head of Rafael, the weapons development authority. He later became the chief scientist for the Israel Ministry of Defense.

== Awards and recognition ==
In 1998, received the Solomon Bublick Award of the Hebrew University of Jerusalem. In 1973, he was awarded Israel Prize in Mathematics.
