= Nathan Agmon =

Israeli writer and translator

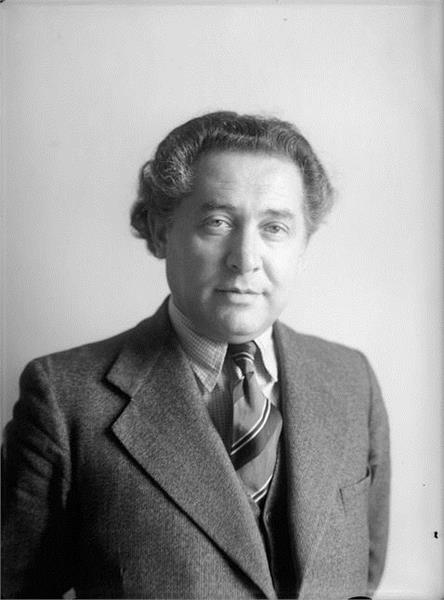
Natan Agmon 1936

Nathan Agmon (Hebrew: נתן אגמון; born Nathan Bistritzky; 1896 in Russian Empire – 1980 in Tel Aviv) was an Israeli writer and translator born in the Russian Empire.

Agmon came to Palestine in 1920, and was a member of the senior staff of the Jewish National Fund from 1922 till retirement in 1952.

He was best known for his dramatic works, including a libretto for Alexander Tansman on the messiah claimant Shabtai Tzvi, and a work on Judas Iscariot, as well as for being the first to translate the complete Don Quixote into Hebrew, in 1958.

== Published works ==
- Days and Nights (Yamim ve-lelot) 1926

== See also ==
- Hebrew literature
