= Assaf Naor =

Israeli mathematician

- אסף נאור
- Born: May 7, 1975 (age 51); Rehovot, Israel
- Education: Hebrew University of Jerusalem
- Awards: EMS Prize (2008); Salem Prize (2008); Bôcher Memorial Prize (2011); Nemmers Prize (2018); Ostrowski Prize (2019)
- Scientific career
- Fields: Mathematics, computer science
- Workplaces: Princeton University, NYU, Microsoft Research
- Doctoral advisor: Joram Lindenstrauss

Assaf Naor (Hebrew: אסף נאור; born May 7, 1975) is an Israeli American and Czech mathematician, computer scientist, and a professor of mathematics at Princeton University.

== Academic career ==
Naor earned a baccalaureate from Hebrew University of Jerusalem in 1996 and a doctorate from the same university in 2002, under the supervision of Joram Lindenstrauss. He worked at Microsoft Research from 2002 until 2007, with an affiliated faculty position at the University of Washington, and joined the NYU faculty in 2006.

== Research ==
Naor's research concerns metric spaces, their properties, and related algorithms, including improved upper bounds on the Grothendieck inequality, applications of this inequality, and research on metrical task systems.

== Awards and honors ==
Naor won the Bergmann award of the United States – Israel Binational Science Foundation in 2007, and the Pazy award of the BSF in 2011. In 2012 he was one of four faculty winners of the Leonard Blavatnik Award of the New York Academy of Sciences, given to young scientists and engineers in New York, New Jersey, and Connecticut.

He won the Salem Prize in 2008 for "contributions to the structural theory of metric spaces and its applications to computer science", and in the same year was given a European Mathematical Society Prize (one of ten awarded to outstanding younger mathematicians). He won the Bôcher Memorial Prize in 2011 "for introducing new invariants of metric spaces and for applying his new understanding of the distortion between various metric structures to theoretical computer science". In 2012 he became a fellow of the American Mathematical Society. He received the Nemmers Prize in Mathematics in 2018 and in 2019 the Ostrowski Prize.

He gave an invited talk at the International Congress of Mathematicians in 2010, on the topic of "Functional Analysis and Applications".
