= Chaim Davidsohn =

Rabbi Chaim Davidsohn (1760, Pińczów – 1854, Warsaw) was the second Chief Rabbi of Warsaw.

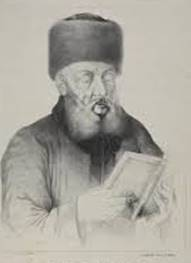
Rabbi Chaim Davidsohn

== Early years ==
He was born in 1760 to Rabbi David Tebele, from whom he orphaned at an early age. In his youth he became known as an illui, and studied Torah under Rabbi David Tebele of Lissa and, according to some sources, Rabbi Yaakov Lorberbaum of Lissa.

At the age of 13 he married Rachel, the daughter of the wealthy Naftali Zvi Tsenzminer. After his marriage, he lived in his father-in-law's house in Warsaw, and continue to study Torah as stipulated by his father-in-law.

After the death of his father-in-law in 1811, he entered into his father-in-law's family business, alongside his wife's brother Israel Hirschensohn, while continuing to study Torah with Rabbi Shlomo Eiger (Israel's son-in-law).

== Community leader ==
He became involved in community affairs, and eventually was considered the senior shtadlan of the Warsaw Jewish community, with his signature appearing on proclamations of the Jewish community council (shiva tovei ha'ir). He served as supervisor ("mashgiach") of the Jewish community council (vaad) for two years, and the Chief Rabbi of Warsaw, Rabbi Szlomo Zalman Lipszyc would consult with him on public affairs.

He supported the November Uprising of 1830-1831 against the Russian Empire and raised funds for the rebels. He opposed Jews joining the rebel forces because that necessitated that they shave their beards and payot, while at the same time he appealed to the rebel leadership to drop that requirement.

In opposition to Chief Rabbi Lipszyc, and the leader of Warsaw's Hassidim, Rabbi Yitzchak Meir Alter of Ger, he supported the establishment of the Szkoła Rabinów w Warszawie (Warsaw Rabbinical School) in 1826, despite its association with the Haskala, relying on its nominal leader, the traditionalist Rabbi Avraham Yaakov Stern, to keep the seminary within the bounds of traditional Orthodoxy. However, a few years later withdrew his support, claiming that it did not practice Orthodoxy.

He founded a cheder for the children of the poor and raised funds for the Jewish community In Erez Israel, in particular for Kollel Polin. After the Galilee earthquake of 1837, he raised large sums which were clandestinely transferred to hard hit Safed by Moses Montefiore.

== Chief Rabbi of Warsaw ==
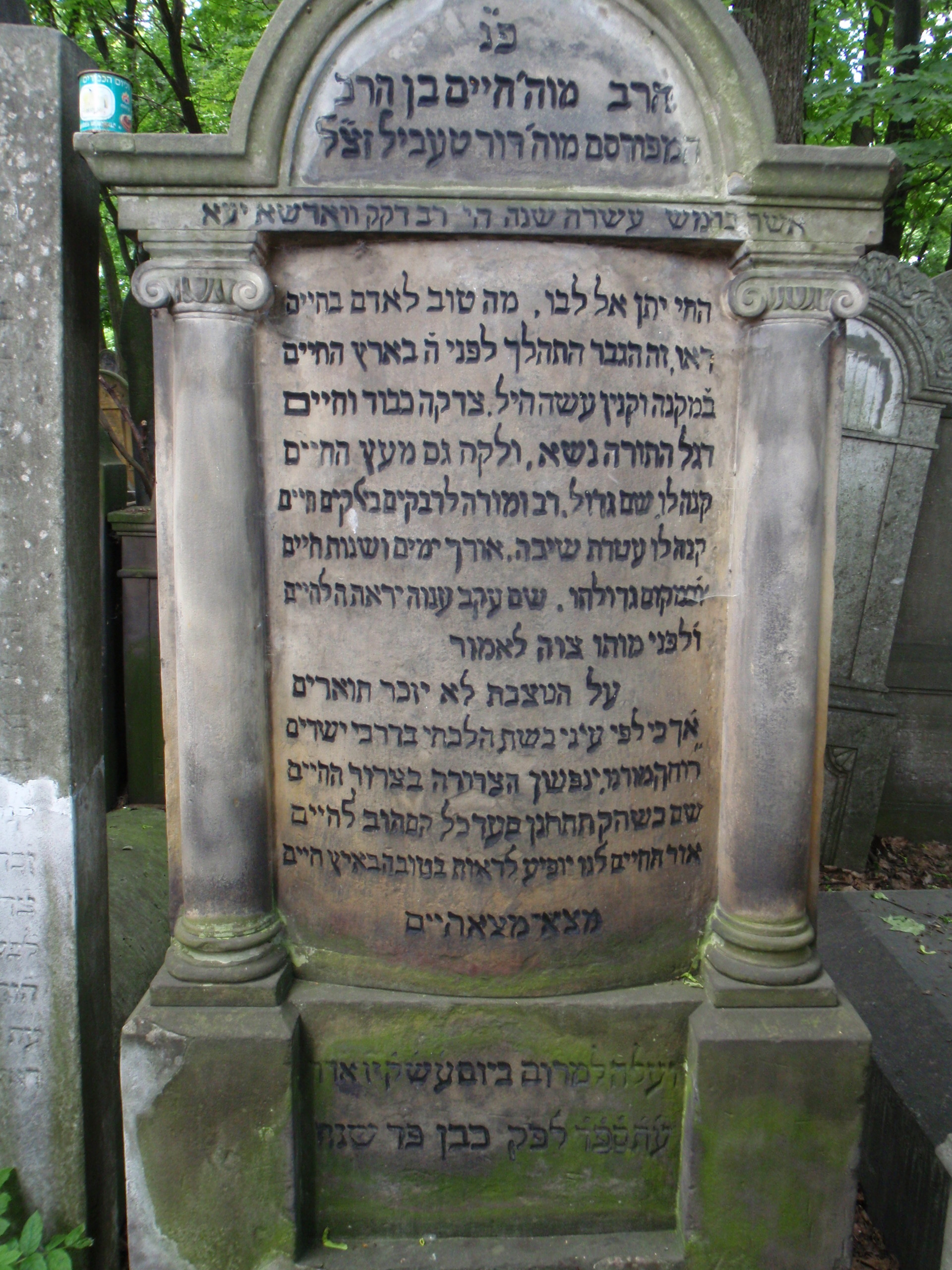
Chaim Davidsohn's grave in the Jewish Cemetery, Warsaw

When Chief Rabbi Lipszyc died in 1839, Rabbi Davidsohn proposed Rabbi David Luria as his replacement, while the Hassidim advocated for Rabbi Alter. However, the majority of the community council wanted Rabbi Davidsohn, despite his age (about 80 years) and despite not serving previously in a rabbinical position. He initially refused, but eventually accepted the appointment. He moved to the Chief Rabbi's official residence and founded a Yeshiva.

During his tenure, halachic questions from throughout Poland were addressed to him, but, out of modesty, before his passing he burned his rabbinical responsa and novellae to prevent them from being published.

He died on the 14th day of Adar at the age of 94 and was buried in the Jewish cemetery in Warsaw, near the grave of his predecessor, Rabbi Lipszyc. He was succeeded as Chief Rabbi of Warsaw by Rabbi Dow Ber Meisels.

== Family ==
His eldest son, Rabbi Avraham Abeli Davidsohn, served as rabbi of Biala and died at an early age. The rest of his sons were merchants and activists in the Jewish community. as well as being scholars. His son Naftali was very wealthy, and served as a mohel, shofar blower, and Torah reader in Warsaw.

Religious titles
Preceded by Szlomo Zalman Lipszyc	Chief Rabbi of Warsaw; 1840 – 1854	Succeeded by Dow Ber Meisels
