= Szlomo Zalman Lipszyc =

Orthodox Rabbi (1765-1839)

Szlomo Zalman Lipszyc (1765 Poznań – 1839 Warsaw), also known as Salomon Zalman Pozner as well as the Chemdas Shlomo from the title of the works he authored, was a prominent Orthodox rabbi, and first Chief Rabbi of Warsaw.

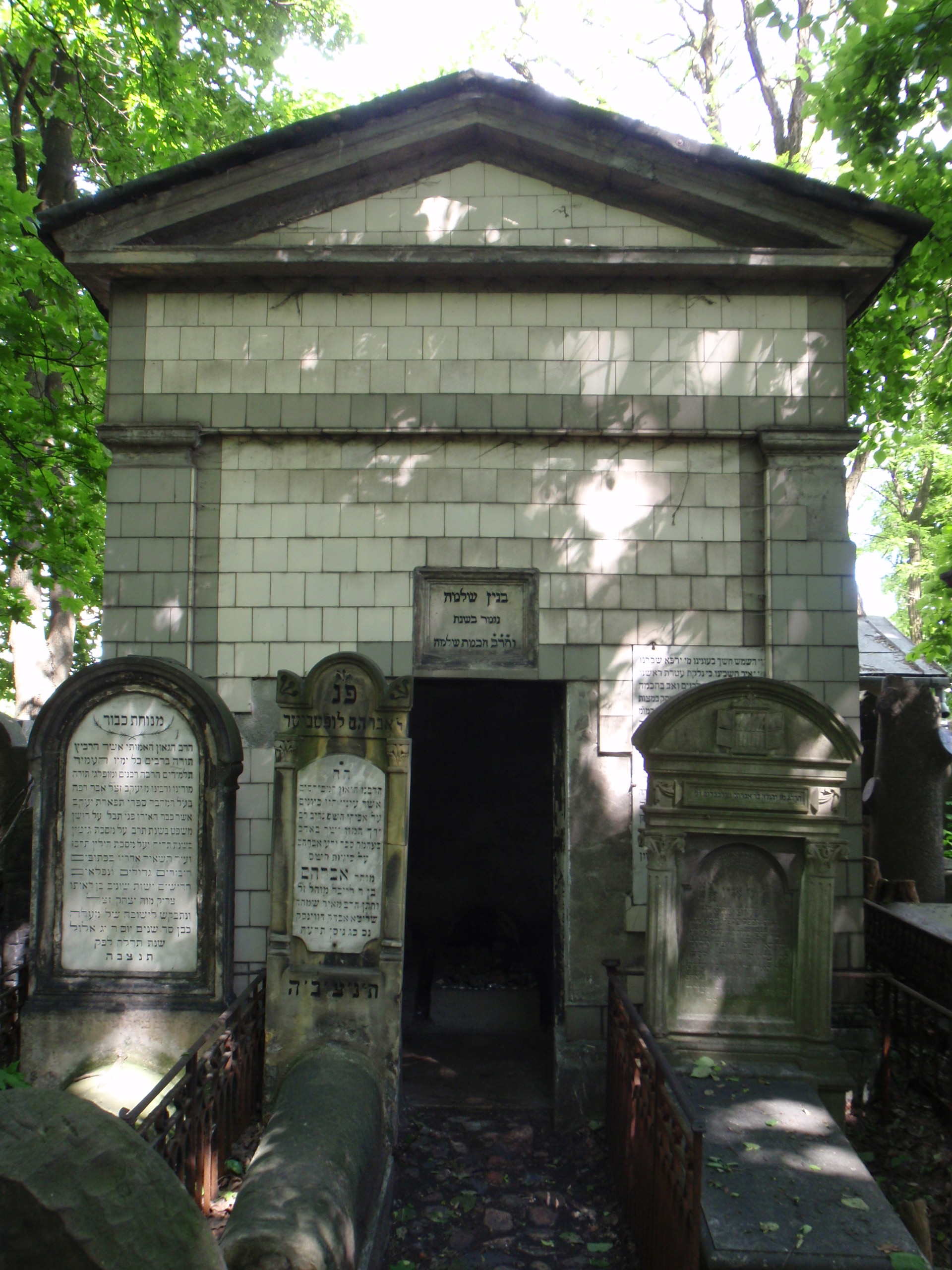
Ohel of Szlomo Zalman Lipszyc in the Jewish Cemetery, Warsaw. In the front left of the photo is the grave of a later Chief Rabbi of Warsaw, Rabbi Yaakov Gesundheit.

He studied Torah in his hometown of Poznań until 1804. Later, material conditions forced him to accept the position of Rabbi of Nasielsk, where he founded a yeshiva. In 1819 he became Rabbi of the Praga district of Warsaw, and in 1821 he was elected the first Chief Rabbi of Warsaw.

As chief rabbi, he did not become involved in the disputes of Misnagdim with the Hasidim. He opposed assimilation, condemning the Haskala's Szkoła Rabinów w Warszawie (Warsaw Rabbinical School), and the entry of Jews to the National Guard in 1831 (due to the necessary condition of shaving their beards and payot).

Many Polish rabbis studied in his Warsaw yeshiva. He was a prominent halakhic authority and the author of three works entitled Chemdas Shlomo: rabbinical responsa (1839), novellae to several Talmudic treatises (vol. 1-3, 1851–1892) and sermons (1890). He carried on a scientific correspondence with Rabbi Akiva Eger and Rabbi Jacob of Lissa.

He was buried in the Jewish cemetery in Warsaw where an ohel was erected above his grave.

Grandson Mojżesz Lipszyc was a rabbi in Golub-Dobrzyń, and then in Łódź, where his great-grandson, Natan Lipszyc, also held rabbinical functions.

Religious titles
Preceded by New office	Chief Rabbi of Warsaw; 1821 – 1839	Succeeded by Chaim Davidsohn
