= Orgelbrand's Universal Encyclopedia (1859) =

Polish encyclopedia

Encyklopedia Powszechna (Universal Encyclopedia, Orgelbrand's Encyclopedia) published by Samuel Orgelbrand in 1859–1868 was one of the first modern Polish encyclopedias.

== History ==
This encyclopedia is often called the first modern Polish encyclopedia (that is also universal and multi-volume). The title of the first Polish encyclopedia is also claimed by older works, e.g. Inventores rerum by Jan Protasowicz encyclopedia from 1608, Encyclopaedia Natvralis Entis by Stanisław Stokowski from 1637 and the Nowe Ateny from 1745.

Universal Encyclopedia was published in Warsaw in Congress Poland - the Polish territory of the Russian partition. Its content was censored by the official tsarist censorship. Later resumes of the first edition of the years (1872-1876, 1877–1879, 1883–1884, 1898–1904) had a volume-reduced form. In 1984–1985, a reprint of the original version was published in Poland.

The creators of the publication's content were many representatives of the Polish nineteenth-century intelligentsia. In entry to the first volume published in 1859, a list of authors of the encyclopedia has been published. It contained the following names:

- Adam Adamowicz
- Jerzy Alexandrowicz
- Władysław Ludwik Anczyc
- Michał Baliński
- Jan Baranowski
- Sadok Barącz
- Adam Bartoszewicz
- Julian Bartoszewicz
- Władysław Bentkowski
- Feliks Berdau
- Leopold Berkiewicz
- Cezary Biernacki
- Julian Bleszyński
- Kazimierz Bujnicki
- Ignacy Chodźko
- Teofil Cichocki
- Wojciech Cybulski
- Wincenty Dawid
- Walenty Dutkiewicz
- Ewa Felińska
- Zenon Fisz
- Henryk Flatau
- Antoni Funkenstein
- Józef Grajnert
- Jan Kanty Gregorowicz
- Leopold Hubert
- Kazimierz Jarochowski
- Jan Jasiński
- Ludwik Jenike
- Adam Jocher
- Karol Jurkiewicz
- Karol Kaczkowski
- Zygmunt Kaczkowski
- Kazimierz Kaszewski
- Adam Kirkor
- Oskar Kolberg
- Ludwik Kondratowicz
- Józef Korzeniowski
- Józef Kowalewski
- Rafał Krajewski
- Józef Ignacy Kraszewski
- Kajetan Kraszewski
- Józef Kremer
- Jan Kulesza
- Marceli Langowski
- Aleksander Lesser
- Franciszek Henryk Lewestam
- Karol Lilpop
- A. Lipnicki
- Hieronim Labęcki
- Józef Łepkowski
- Franciszek Maciejowski
- Józef Majer
- Franciszek Maciejowski
- Antoni Marcinkowski
- Józef Maczyński
- Adam Mieczyński
- Feliks Jan Szczęsny Morawski
- Antoni Morzycki
- August Mosbach
- Ludwik Neugebauer
- Otto Leopold
- Jan Pankiewicz
- Jan Papłoński
- Piotr Perkowski
- Nikodem Pęczarski
- Ludwik Pietrusiński
- Szymon Pisulewski
- Jan Feliks Piwarski
- Aleksander Połujański
- Józef Procki
- Adam Prażmowski
- Wincenty Prokopowicz
- Wincenty Przyałgowski
- Stanisław Przystański
- Alfons Puchewicz
- Ksawery Rakowski
- Antoni Rogalewicz
- Leon Rogulski
- Kazimierz Rogiński
- Paweł Rzewuski
- Walerian Serwatowski
- Hipolit Skimborowicz
- Fryderyk Skobel
- Franciszek Maksymilian Sobieszczański
- Leon Sokołowski
- Henryk Suchecki
- Wiktor Szokalski
- Wacław Sztulc
- Michał Szymanowski
- Michał Bohusz Szyszko
- Władysław Taczanowski
- Franciszek Wężyk
- Karol Widman
- Kazimierz Władysław Wóycicki
- Ludwik Wolski
- Antoni Wrotnowski
- Wincenty Wrześniowski
- Józef Wyszyński
- Gustaw Zieliński
- Feliks Żochowski

== Content ==
It counted a total of 28 volumes, each of which had almost 1000 pages:

- T.1 (A-Aos, 999 p.)
- T.2 (Ap-Bąk, 1088 p.)
- T.3 (B-Bol, 982 p.)
- T.4 (Bol-Cec, 984 p.)
- T.5 (C-Cul, 983 p.)
- T.6 (Cul-Den, 983 p.)
- T.7 (Den-Eck, 983 p.)
- T.8 (Eck-Flem, 983 p.)
- T.9 (Flem-Glin, 984 p.)
- T.10 (Glin-Guis, 983 p.)
- T.11 (Gui-Hof, 983 p.)
- T.12 (Hof-Jan, 983 p.)
- T.13 (Jan-Kapil, 983 p.)
- T.14 (Kapil-Kodeń, 983 p.)
- T.15 (Kodesz-Krasiń, 983 p.)
- T.16 (Krasiń-Libelt, 983 p.)
- T.17 (Libelt-Marek, 983 p.)
- T.18 (Maremmy-Mstów, 983 p.)
- T.19 (Msta-Optymaci, 983 p.)
- T.20 (Optymaci-Polk, 983 p.)
- T.21 (Polk-Realne szkoły i nauki, 983 p.)
- T.22 (Realne szkoły i nauki-Saski błękit, 983 p.)
- T.23 (Saski błękit-Starowiercy, 983 p.)
- T.24 (Starowiercy-Tarnogrodzka konfederacyja, 979 p.)
- T.25 (Tarnogrodzka konfederacyja-Uła, 983 p.)
- T.26 (Uła-Wikaryusz, 983 p.)
- T.27 (Wikaryusz-Wybrzeże, 983 p.)
- T.28 (Wybrzeże-Żyżmory, 1198 p.)

== Bibliography ==
- Collective work (1859). Encyklopedia Powszechna t.I, (A-Aos) (in Polish). Warsaw: Wydawnictwo Orgelbranda.
