= Ewa Felińska =

Polish writer

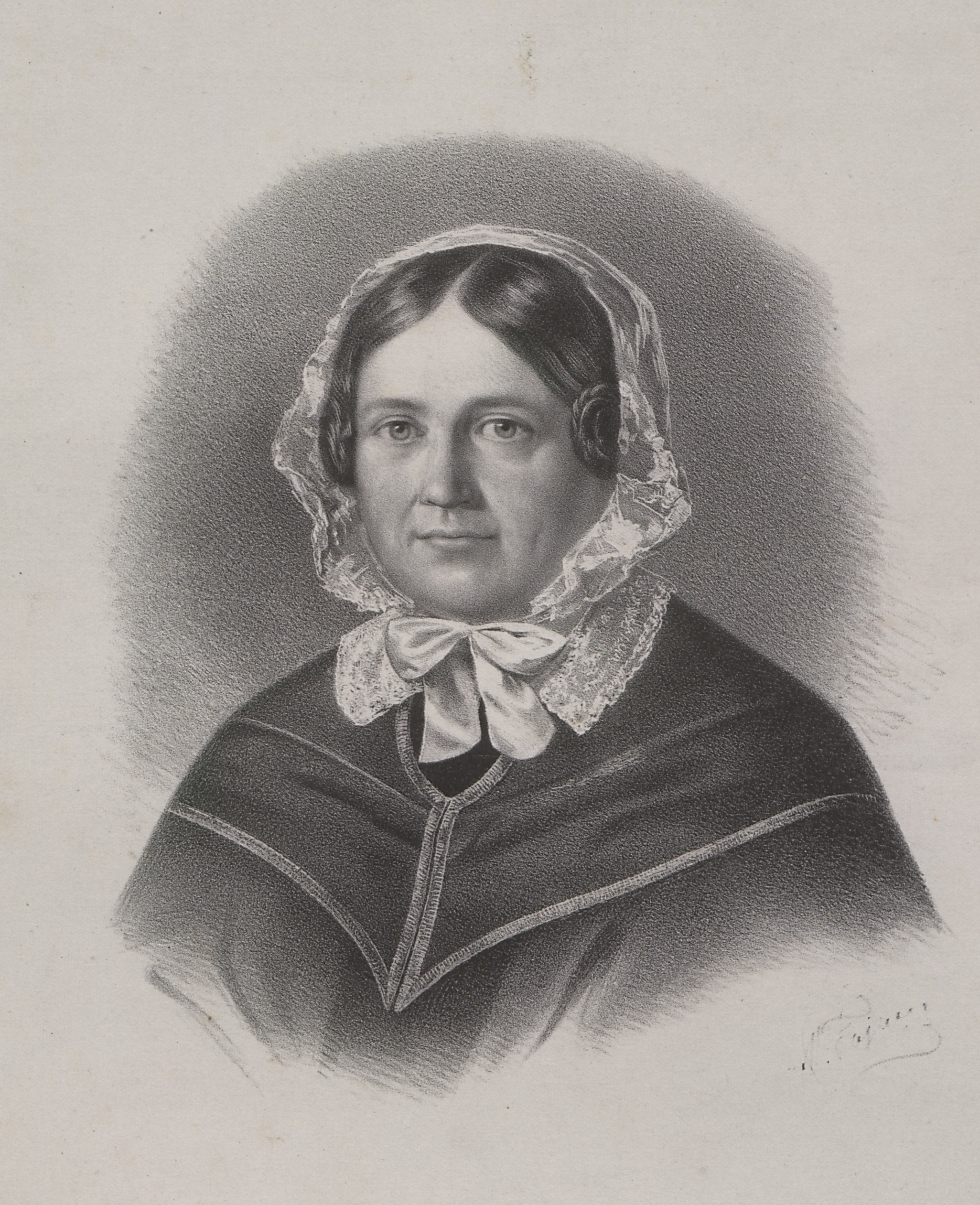
- Born: Ewa Wendorff; December 26, 1793; Slutsk, Belarus
- Died: December 20, 1859 (aged 65); Wojutyn, Poland
- Occupations: Secretary, writer

Ewa Felińska was a Polish writer and prosaist. She is most notable for authoring several novels and for her contributions to Orgelbrand's Universal Encyclopedia. She was the mother of Zygmunt Szczęsny Feliński.

== Biography ==
Felińska (née Wendorff) was born on 26 December 1793 in eastern Poland. Her family was considered moderately wealthy, members of the landed middle class. Though born in the Russian Empire, her family was culturally Polish (Sluck, the province she was born in, had been partitioned by Russia the year of her birth). Ewa married Gerard Felinski (brother of writer Alojzy Feliński) when she was 18, and they went on to have six children, among them Zygmunt Szczęsny Feliński, a future archbishop of Warsaw.

Following her husband's death in 1833, Felińska moved her family to Kremenets, which she hoped would have better educational opportunities for her children. Felińska became involved in a growing pro-independence faction in the city, which wanted to gain Polish independence from the Russian Empire. Using her writing talent, she gained a position of importance in the organization, eventually being appointed as the secretary for the independence group. However, in 1839 the group was broken up by the Russian authorities, resulting in Felińska's arrest, sentencing, and exile to Siberia.

Following her exile, Felińska remained in Siberia, before being relocated to Saratov in 1841. During her time in Siberia, Saratov, and other places inside Russia, she wrote a number of memoirs documenting her experiences. She also published accounts of Siberian and Volgan folklore. In addition, she wrote several novels and entries in Samuel Orgelbrand's Encyklopedia Powszechna - the first modern Polish encyclopedia. She died in 1859.
