= Avraham Stern (disambiguation) =

Avraham or Abraham Stern may refer to:

- Avraham Stern (1907–1942), Irgun leader and founder of the "Stern Gang" breakaway group
- Avraham Stern (politician) (1935–1997), Israeli politician
- Abe Stern (1888–1951), American film producer, co-founder of Universal Studios
- Abraham Stern (inventor) (c. 1760s–1842), Polish Jewish inventor
