= Herschell Filipowski =

Lithuanian-born British Hebraist, editor and actuary (1816–1872)

- Born: Tzvi Hirsh Filipowski; 1816; Virbalis, Russian Empire (now Lithuania)
- Died: June 12, 1872 (aged 55–56); Brixton, London, United Kingdom
- Burial place: Fulham Road Jewish Cemetery
- Occupations: Editor, writer, actuary
- Spouse: Esther Filipowski (b. 1817)
- Children: Matilda Filipowski (b. 1836); Denison Filipowski (b. 1847); Concezio Filipowski (b. 1849); Abraham Filipowski (b. 1850)

Herschell E. Filipowski FSA (1816 – 12 June 1872), also known as Tzvi Hirsh Filipowski (Hebrew: צְבִי הִירְשׁ פִילִיפּוֹבְסְקִי, Yiddish: צבי הירש פֿיליפּאָווסקי), was a Lithuanian-born British Jewish Hebraist, editor, mathematician, linguist and actuary.

== Biography ==
=== Early life ===
Herschell Filipowski was born in the town of Virbalen, Russian Empire (today Virbalis, Lithuania) in 1816. He showed great aptitude for the study of mathematics and languages at an early age, and was fortunate in finding a Polish schoolmaster who secretly aided him in acquiring the rudiments of a modern education. Besides his native Yiddish, Filipowski became conversant in Polish, Russian, Latin, Hebrew, Arabic, English, Spanish, French, German, and Chinese, and at age 15 he published An Almanac for One Hundred Years in both Polish and Russian.

In 1839 he emigrated to England, and received an appointment as a Teacher of Hebrew and Oriental languages at the Jews' College and the West Metropolitan Jewish School. His first published work was Mo'ed Mo'adim on the Jewish, Karaite, Christian, and Muslim calendars (1846; republished 1863), with tables from the Creation to the year AM 6000. In 1847 he edited a Hebrew annual, Ha-Asif, or Harvest: The Annual Hebrew Magazine, containing various essays on Hebrew literature and mathematics, in both Hebrew and English (1849).

The Jewish Chronicle praised Filipowski's calendrical calculations for correcting the defects of Elias H. Lindo's Calendar, especially his erroneous method for calculating the termination of Shabbat in London. According to Filipowski, for almost a decade London Jews had been ending the Shabbat and festivals at the wrong time. Even more serious was the implication that, since the termination of the day affects the time at which the brit milah takes place, users of Lindo's Calendar might have performed that operation on the seventh or ninth day, instead of the eighth day as required by Jewish law.

=== Actuarial career ===
Filipowski afterwards was employed as an actuary for the Colonial and Standard Life offices in Edinburgh, a position he kept for about eight years. He later worked as an actuary for the Mercantile, Professional, and General Life and Guarantee Insurance Company, and as an assistant computer at the Royal and Briton companies.

In this capacity, he published A Table of Anti-Logarithms (1849), which included a testimonial by mathematician Augustus De Morgan and established Filipowski's name among mathematicians. He later published Napier's Canon of Logarithms (1857), a translation of John Napier's Logarithmorum Canonis Descriptio from the Latin into English, and in 1864–66 he edited Francis Baily's Doctrine of Life Annuities and Assurance. The monthly periodical The Actuarial Magazine, devoted to tables of different kinds, was also edited by Filipowski for a short time.

Filipowski returned to London in 1860, where he designed a multiplying machine which made use of Slonimski's theorem. The machine's calculating rods include a set of fifty-six wooden cylindrical rods stored in holes in a wooden mahogany case. One of Filipowski's calculating devices survives at the Science Museum, London.

=== Hebrew publications ===
Title page to Filipowski's Matzref la-Kesef (1854)

In 1851 Filipowski founded a Jewish antiquarian society, Ḥevrat Me'orerei Yeshenim (a forerunner of the Mekitze Nirdamim), in connection with which he published many important and valuable works in Hebrew. He edited and published for the society translations of Solomon ibn Gabirol's Mivḥar ha-Peninim (1851), Abraham bar Ḥiyya's Sefer ha-'Ibbur (1851), Azariah dei Rossi's Matzref la-Kesef (1854), Menahem ben Saruk's Maḥberet (1854), Dunash ben Labrat's Teshuvot (1855), and Abraham Zacuto's Sefer Yuḥasin ha-Shalem, with notes by Jacob Emden (1857).

In 1862 he designed a font of Hebrew type with the vowel-points attached to the letters, from which a pocket edition of the Ashkenazi siddur was printed, containing also an English translation by him. In 1867 he founded a short-lived periodical, The Hebrew National, and in 1870 published Biblical Prophecies, on the Jewish position in regard to the Biblical prophecies and the Messiah. A few months before his death in June 1872, Filipowski completed his Hebrew and Roman Almanack from the Year 1 C.E. to Perpetuity.

== Awards and honours ==
In appreciation of his services to antiquarian research, he was elected a fellow of the Antiquarian Society, and for his actuarial work an honorary fellow of the Society of Actuaries.
