= Jewish Cemetery, Warsaw =

Cemetery in Warsaw, Poland

Warsaw Jewish Cemetery
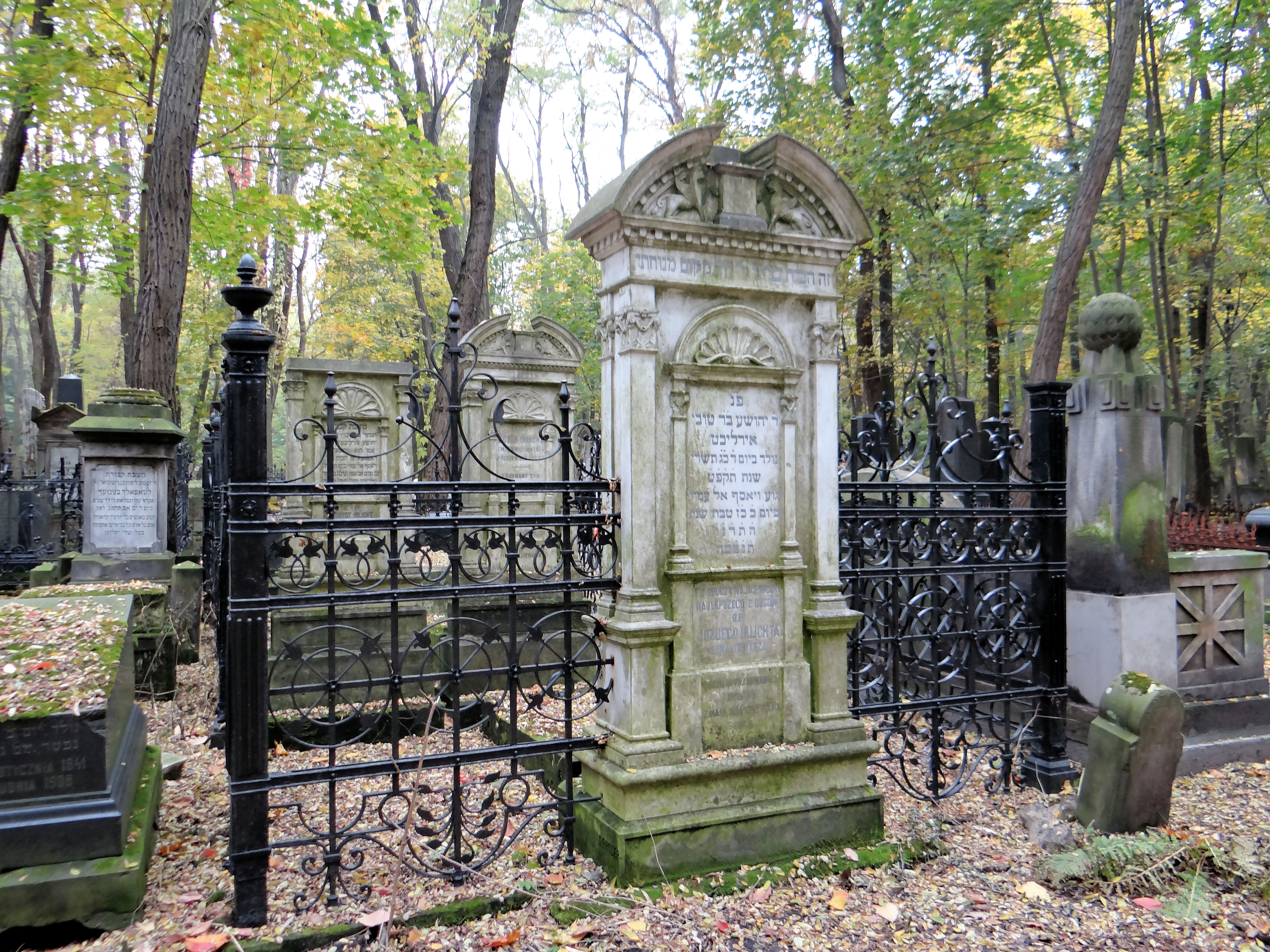
- Graves at Okopowa Street Jewish Cemetery
- Interactive map of Warsaw Jewish Cemetery

Details
- Established: 1806
- Location: Warsaw, Poland
- Coordinates: 52°14′51″N 20°58′29″E
- Type: Jewish cemetery
- Size: 33 ha
- No. of graves: 200,000-300,000

The Warsaw Jewish Cemetery is one of the largest Jewish cemeteries in Europe and in the world. Located on Warsaw's Okopowa Street and abutting the Christian Powązki Cemetery, the Jewish necropolis was established in 1806 and occupies 33 hectares (83 acres) of land. The cemetery contains over 250,000 marked graves, as well as mass graves of victims of the Warsaw Ghetto. Although the cemetery was closed down during World War II, after the war it was reopened and a small portion of it remains active, serving Warsaw's existing Jewish population.

As the necropolis was established to replace many smaller cemeteries closer to the city centre, it was designed to serve all Jewish communities of Warsaw, regardless of their affiliation. Hence, it is subdivided into several districts dubbed quarters (kwatery), historically reserved for various groups. Among them are three Orthodox (for men, women and one for holy scriptures), Reform Judaism, children, military and Warsaw Ghetto Uprising victims.

The cemetery, which has become a dense forest in the post-war period, is filled with monuments dedicated to notable personas such as politicians, spiritual leaders, inventors, economists and others. Many of the markers are simple, others are elaborately carved and richly decorated. Large mausoleums appear in styles ranging from Egyptian revival to Art Deco.

== History ==
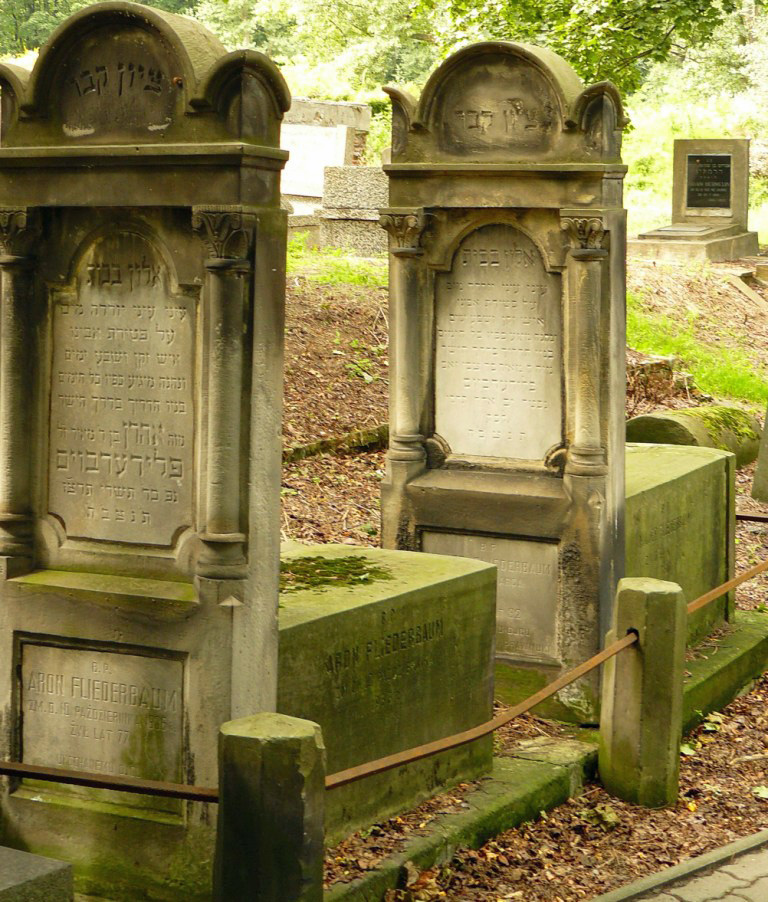
Jewish graves in Warsaw

In 1806 Warsaw's Jewish Commune petitioned the government to establish a new cemetery for Jewish inhabitants of Warsaw. The Bródno Jewish Cemetery, in existence since 1769, was nearly at capacity and the chevra kadisha sought a new burial ground. The lot chosen was located right outside of the city limits in the borough of Wola, next to a new Catholic Powązki Cemetery established in 1790. The petition was accepted and in the following year the cemetery was established. The earliest headstone was dated December 6, 1806 and belonged to certain Nachum son of Nachum of Siemiatycze, but it did not survive to our times. The first woman interred there was certain Elka Junghoff, daughter of Jehuda Leib Mulrat of Kalisz. Her tombstone is dated November 26, 1804, but the date is most likely wrong. Hence the oldest surviving headstone belongs to Sara, daughter of Eliezer (died September 8, 1807).

Unlike other cemeteries in Europe, all the graves in the Okopowa Street cemetery have their backs to the cemetery gate. The tradition of placing graves facing the cemetery gate stems from the belief that at the future resurrection of the dead, the dead will rise up and be able to leave the cemetery without having to turn around. However, in 1819, when one community member was accidentally buried with his head, rather than his feet, facing the cemetery gate, Rabbi Szlomo Zalman Lipszyc, the first Chief Rabbi of Warsaw, ruled that all future burials should be done the same way, to avoid causing embarrassment to the first one buried in this manner.

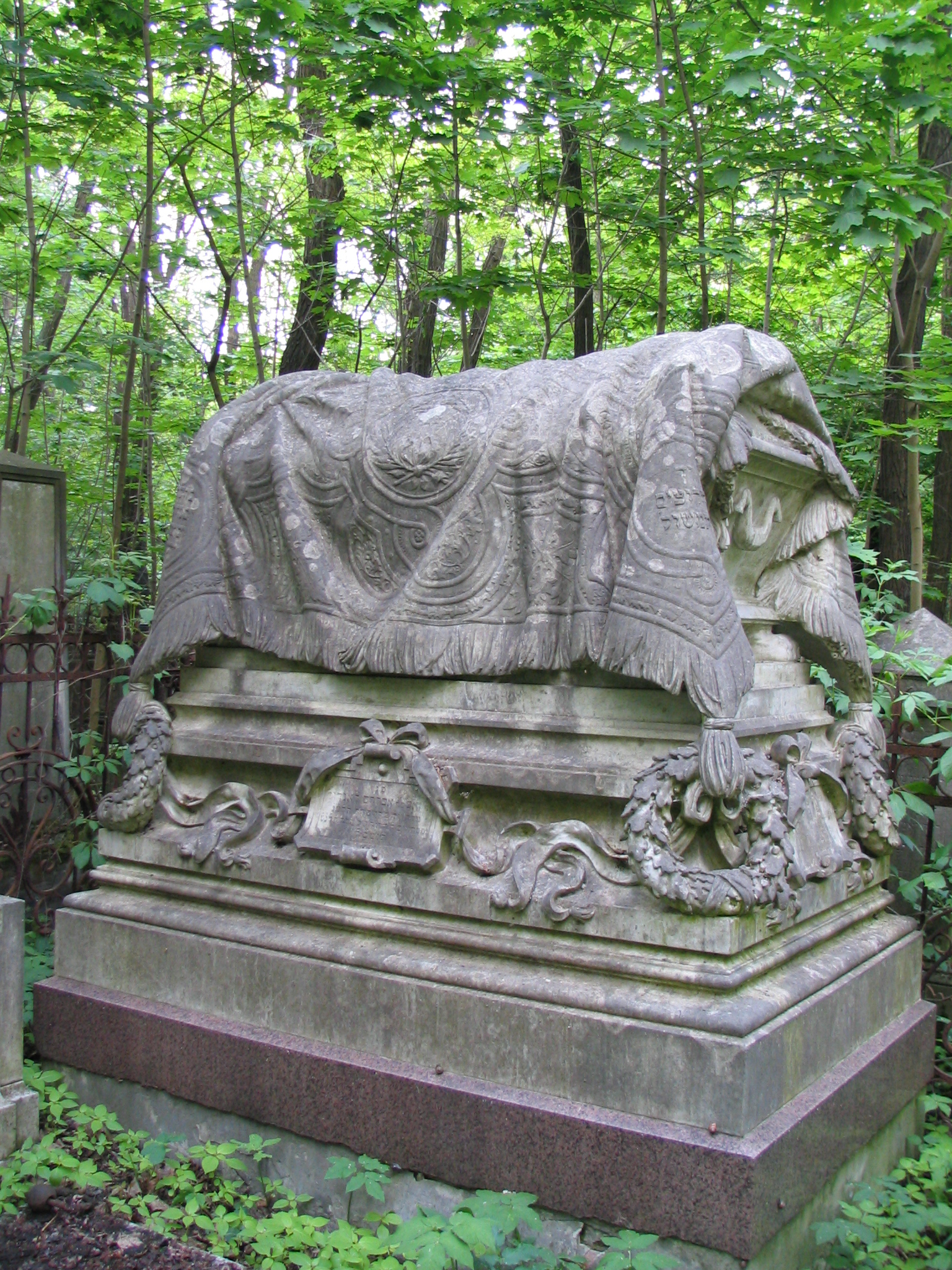
Monumental grave of Wilhelm and Ewa Landau

During the first decades of its existence the new Okopowa Street cemetery was used mostly by the higher strata of Jewish society, with poorer Jews interred in the Bródno Jewish Cemetery in the easternmost borough of Bródno, on the right bank of the Vistula. Despite that the cemetery quickly became overcrowded and already in 1824 it had to be expanded. Around that time the Tsarist authorities took over the administration of the cemetery from the chevra kadisha and by 1850 established a separate funeral administration. The first on-site funeral home was established in 1828, but already in 1831 it was destroyed by Russian Army in the course of the November Uprising. A new building was erected the following year and further expanded in 1854. In the meantime the necropolis was extended twice: in 1840 and 1848. Around that time it became the main Jewish cemetery of Warsaw, for rich and poor alike.

Historically the cemetery was separated from the city centre and the quarter inhabited by Jews by a deep ditch, the so-called Lubomirski Ramparts, created in 1777 to stop the spread of plague and as a tax measure. It was not until 1873 that both Jewish and Catholic communities were allowed to build a bridge across the ditch to facilitate access to both cemeteries. In 1860 and 1863 the cemetery was extended again and in 1869 reached its present form. However, it began to overcrowd and in 1885 all burials financed by the Jewish community (i.e. of the poor) were directed to the Bródno Jewish Cemetery. In 1877 several notable Jewish families of Warsaw financed a new late Neo-Classical building by Adolf Schimmelpfennig housing a synagogue and two burial houses (one for men and one for women). The second floor was reserved for the rabbi's flat.

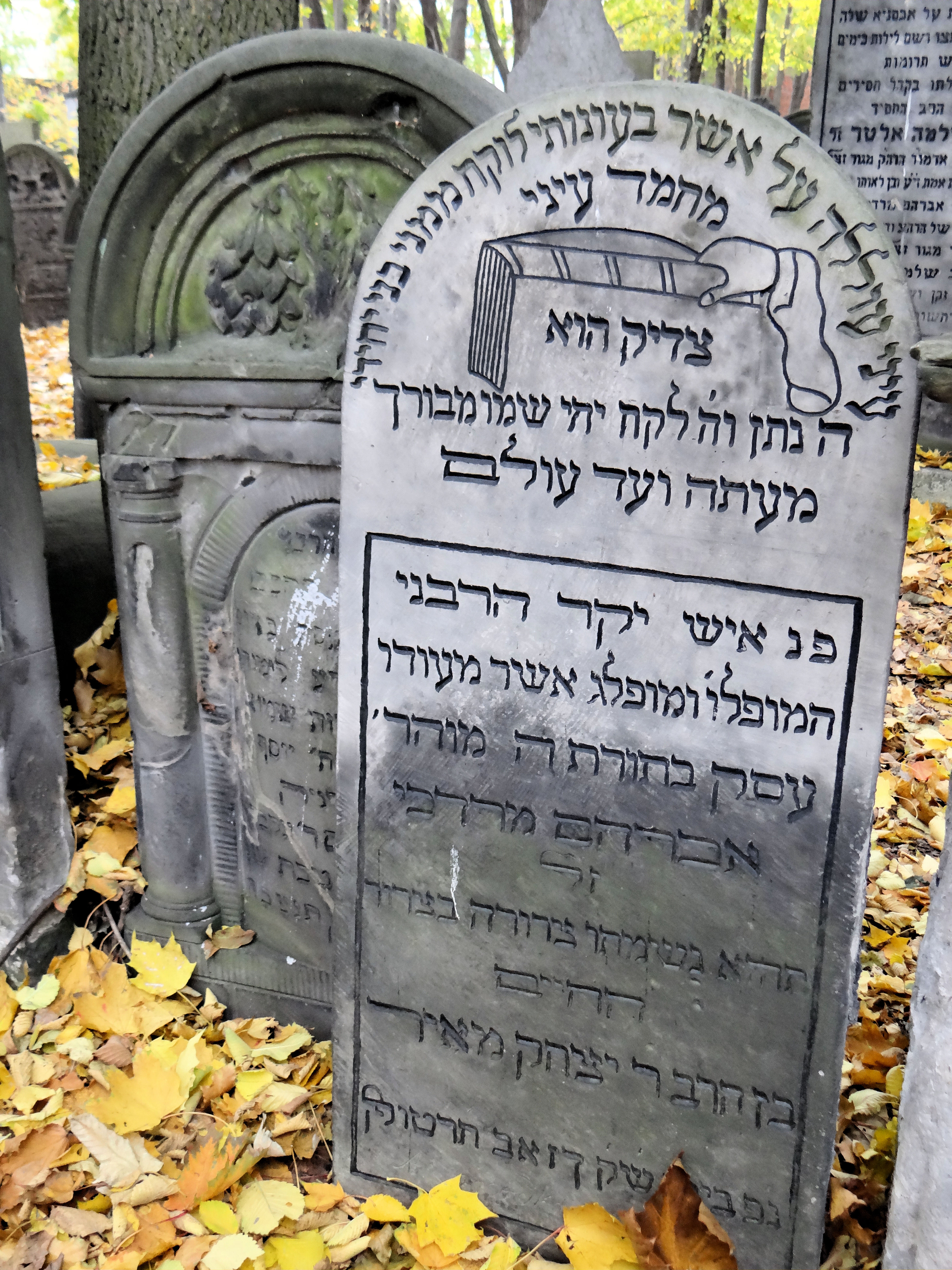
Less elaborate tombstones

As the cemetery was used by all groups of Warsaw's Jewry, conflicts arose over control of the cemetery and various burial-related issues. In 1913 it was agreed to split it onto four parts: one for Orthodox Jews, one for Reform Jews, one for children, and one for military and state burials. After World War I the cemetery again became overcrowded. Subsequently, a mound or earthwork terrace was erected over the quarter previously reserved for children to allow for more burials. Between 1918 and 1936 fourteen such mounds were created. In the 1930s the entire cemetery was surrounded with a high wall, and in 1939 construction started on a Mausoleum of Jews Fighting for Polish Independence. Works were stopped by the outbreak of World War II and the German occupation of Poland.

During World War II the cemetery was partly demolished. German forces used it for mass executions and the burial of victims of Warsaw Ghetto, the Warsaw Ghetto Uprising, the Warsaw Uprising of 1944, and other mass murders. Those burials included both Jews and non-Jews. Following the Ghetto Uprising, on May 15, 1943 the Germans detonated all buildings in the area of the cemetery, including the synagogue and burial houses. Only a small well survives to this day. Further damage was done to the cemetery during the Warsaw Uprising of 1944, when the front line passed directly through the cemetery. After the war the cemetery was reopened.

Plans for the reconstruction of Warsaw drawn up by the Polish government included a new main thoroughfare cutting through the cemetery, which drew protests from Jewish organizations in the United States. In July 1962 the American executive of the World Federation of Polish Jews wrote to Prime Minister Józef Cyrankiewicz saying the projected road would be considered a "sacrilege". That September the Polish ambassador, Edward Drożniak, told a delegation of the American Jewish Committee headed by Jacob Blaustein that the rehabilitation plans would not affect the cemetery. In October, the Polish embassy stated that reconstruction plans in Warsaw would not affect it at least until 1970. The plans for the road were not carried out.

In the 1990s the neglected cemetery started to be renovated for the first time since the 1930s, mostly by the re-created Warsaw Jewish Commune and the Nissenbaum Family Foundation, as well as the City of Warsaw municipal government. The cemetery is still open, with 20 to 30 new burials every year.

== Notable interments ==
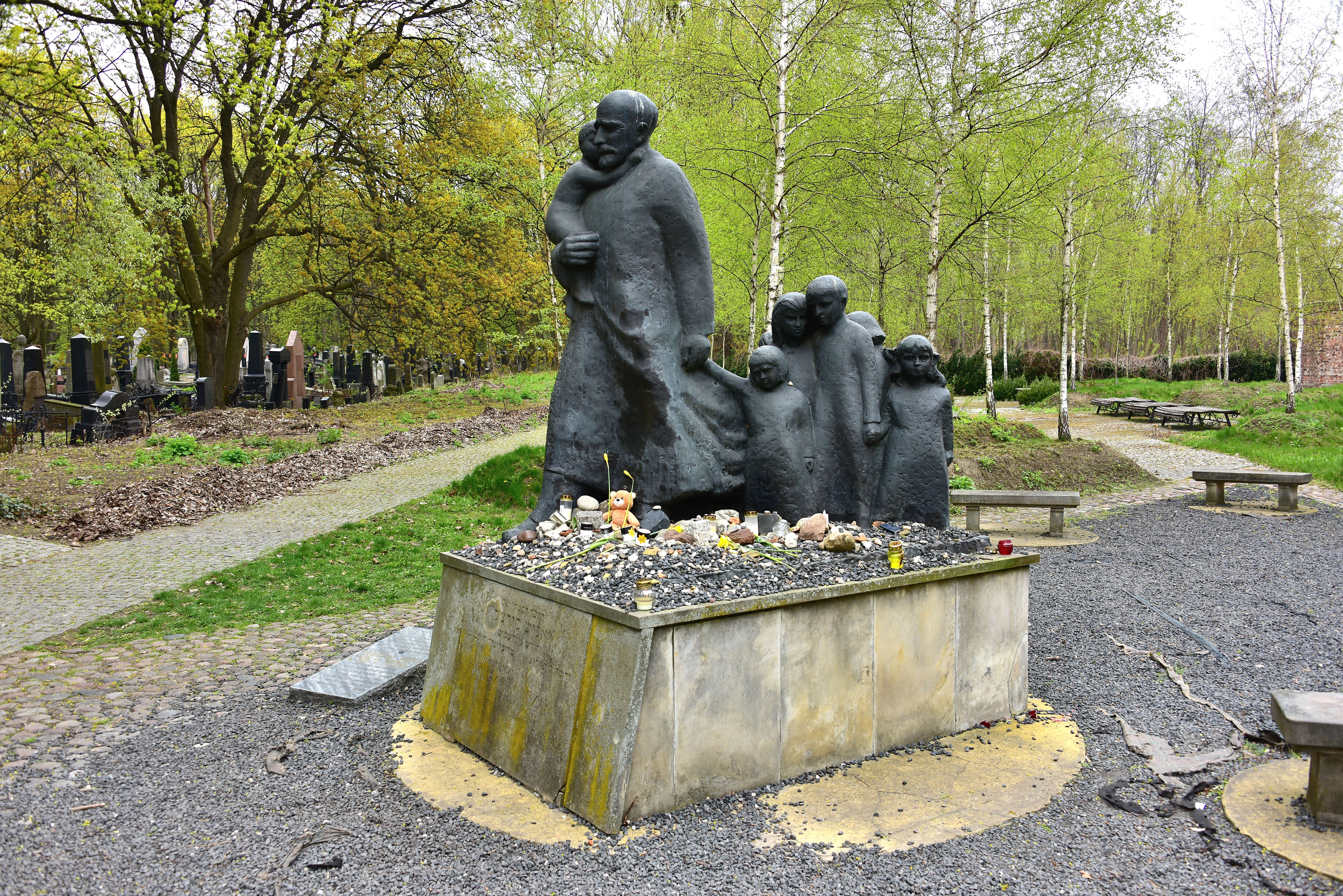
A monument (Cenotaph) dedicated to Janusz Korczak

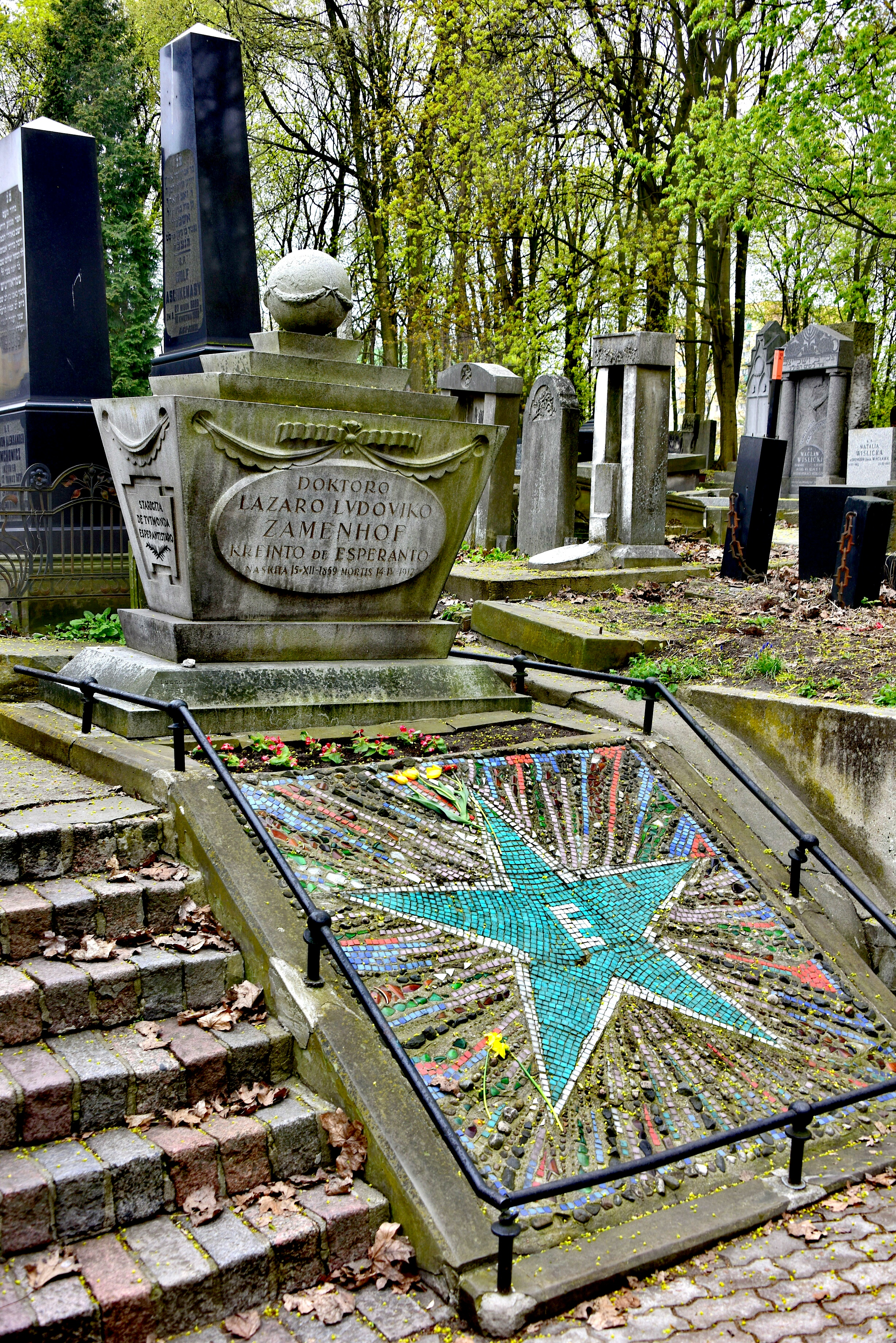
Grave of Ludwik Zamenhof

- S. An-sky, Yiddish writer (born Solomon Zangwill Rappaport), author of The Dybbuk
- Szymon Askenazy, archaeologist
- Meir Balaban
- Naftali Zvi Yehuda Berlin, Rosh yeshiva of the Volozhin Yeshiva and author of several major Jewish works
- Mathias Bersohn, philanthropist
- Adam Czerniakow (1880–1942), head of the Judenrat in the Warsaw Ghetto
- Szymon Datner, historian
- Jacob Dinezon (1852–1919), writer
- Marek Edelman
- Maksymilian Fajans, artist, lithographer and photographer
- Maurycy Fajans, founder of the Maurycy Fajans Steam Navigation Company on the Vistula
- Alexander Flamberg, chess master
- Edward Flatau, neurologist
- Uri Nissan Gnessin, writer
- Samuel Goldflam, neurologist
- Ester Rachel Kamińska (1870–1925), the "mother of Yiddish Theater", mother of Ida Kamińska
- Michał Klepfisz
- Janusz Korczak, famous author and physician
- Izaak Kramsztyk, rabbi and lawyer
- Aleksander Lesser, painter and art critic
- Szlomo Zalman Lipszyc, first Chief Rabbi of Warsaw
- Marian Małowist, historian
- Dow Ber Meisels, rabbi of Kraków and Warsaw
- Eliyahu Shlomo HaLevi of Lida, Hasidic rabbi
- Samuel Orgelbrand, publisher of the Universal Encyclopaedia
- Isaac Loeb Peretz (1852–1915) one of the most important Yiddish language writers of the 19th-20th centuries
- Samuel Abraham Poznański
- Józef Różański, communist activist
- Józef Sandel, art historian and critic
- Hayyim Selig Slonimski, Hebrew publisher, astronomer, inventor and science author
- Chaim Soloveitchik, founder of the Brisk rabbinic dynasty & the "brisker method" of Talmudic study
- Julian Stryjkowski, (born Pesach Stark) 1905–1996, writer, author of "Austeria" "Voices in Darkness"
- Hipolit Wawelberg, founder of Warsaw Technical College,
- Szymon Winawer, chess player
- Lucjan Wolanowski
- Ludwik Zamenhof, doctor and inventor of Esperanto.

== See also ==
- Jewish cemeteries of Warsaw
- Monument to the Memory of Children - Victims of the Holocaust
- History of the Jews in Warsaw
