= Samuel Orgelbrand =

Polish-Jewish printer, bookseller, and publisher (1810-1868)

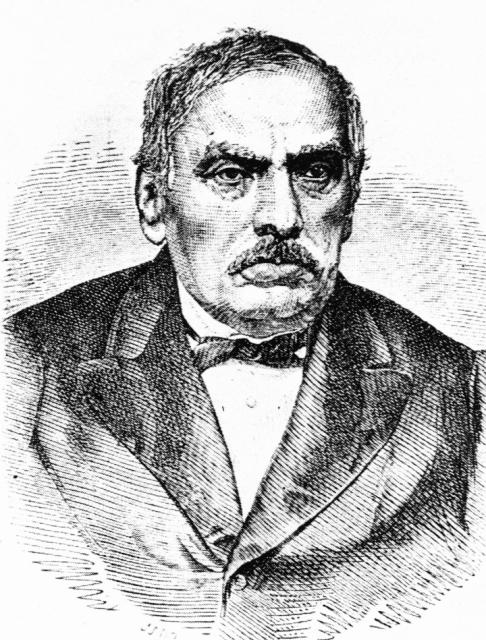
- Born: 1810; Warsaw, Duchy of Warsaw
- Died: 16 November 1868 (aged 58); Warsaw, Congress Poland
- Resting place: Jewish Cemetery, Warsaw
- Education: Warsaw Rabbinical School
- Writing career
- Language: Polish, Hebrew, Yiddish
- Years active: 1829–1868
- Notable work: Orgelbrand's Universal Encyclopedia

Samuel Orgelbrand (1810 – 16 November 1868) was a Polish-Jewish printer, bookseller, and publisher. He is best known as the initiator, organizer, and publisher of the Encyklopedia Powszechna (Universal Encyclopedia), or "Orgelbrand's Encyclopedia", the first modern Polish encyclopedia.

== Biography ==
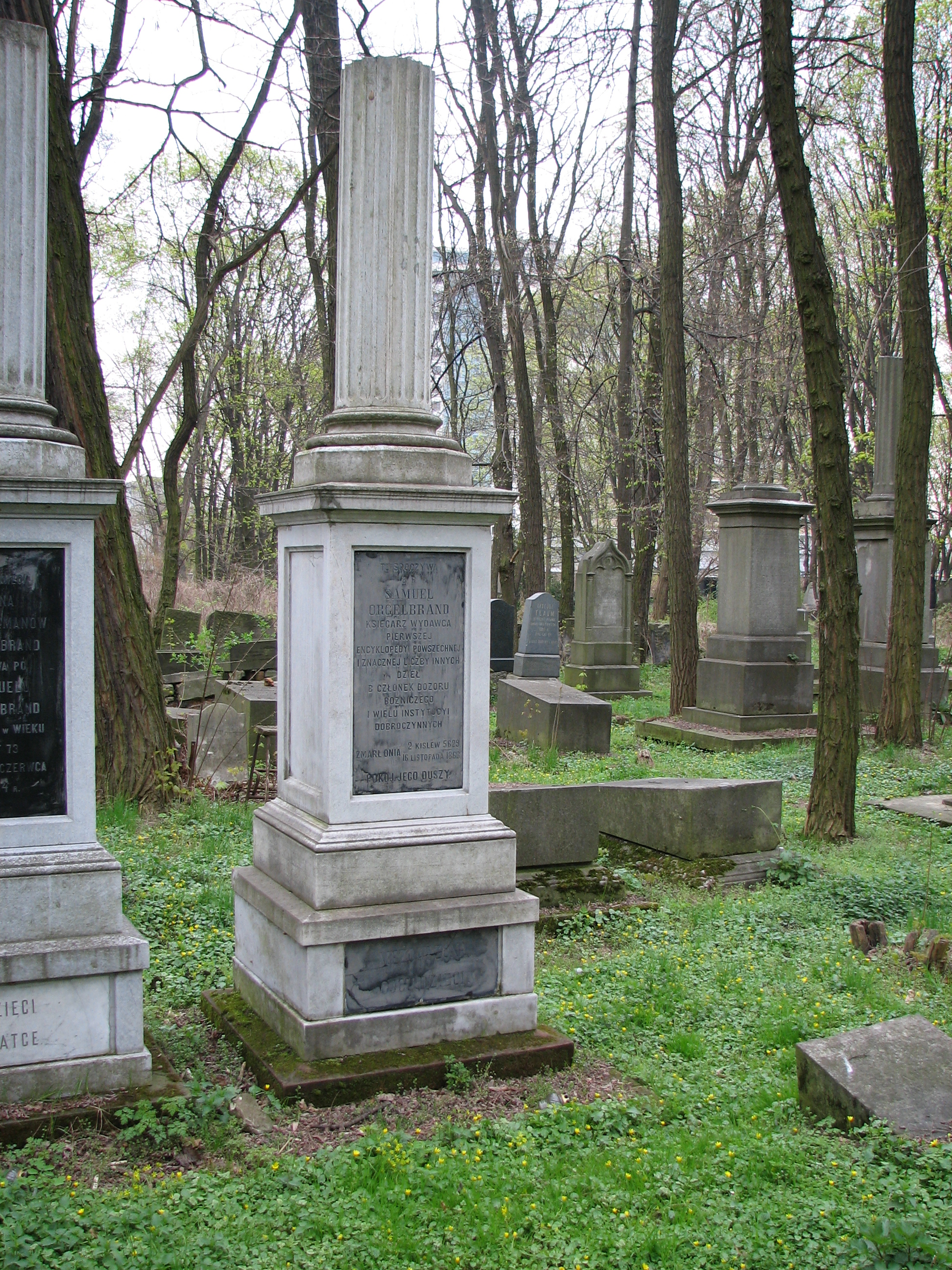
Orgelbrand's tomb in Okopowa Street Jewish Cemetery in Warsaw

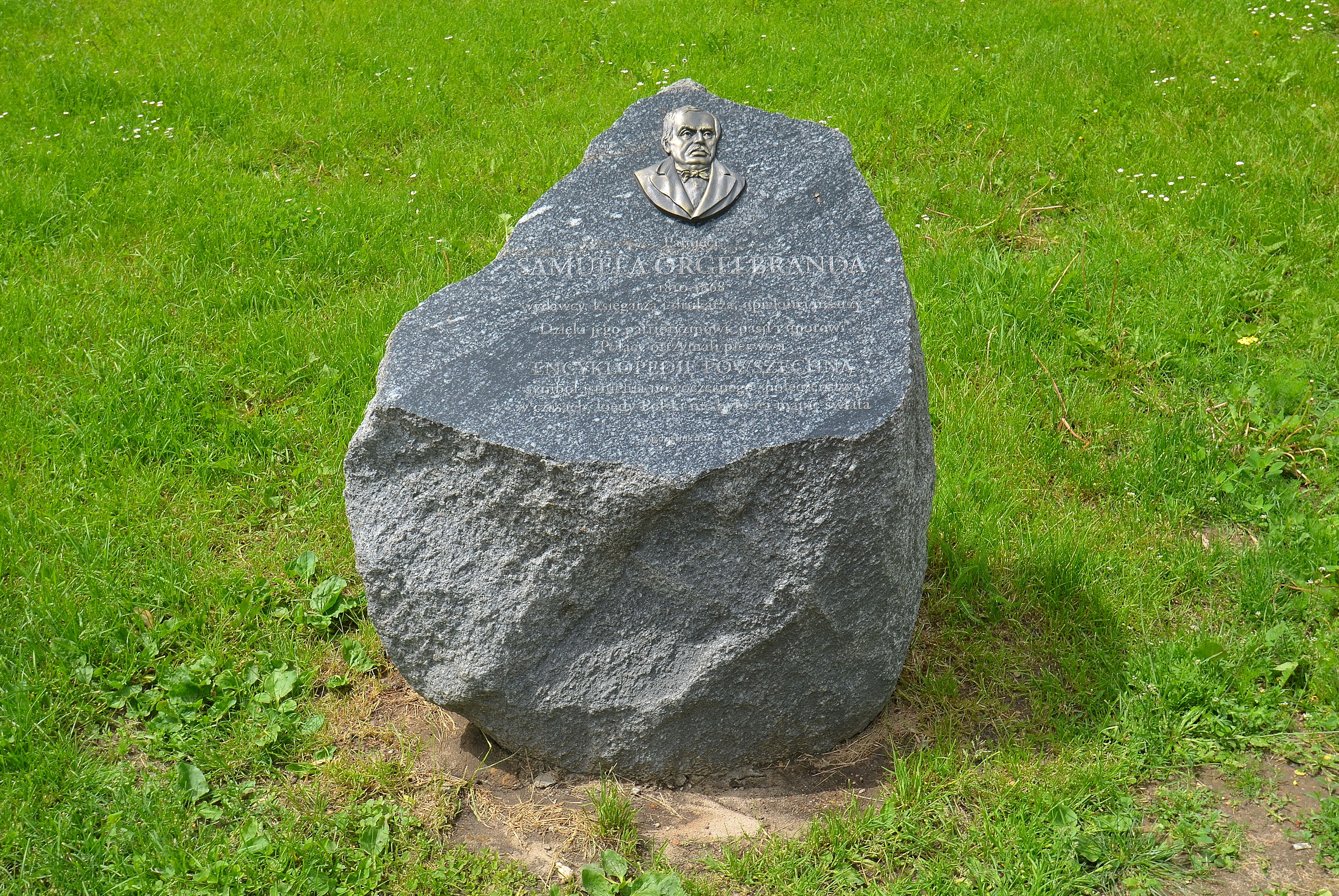
Commemorative stone in Orgelbrand Square

Samuel Orgelbrand was born in 1810 in Warsaw. He attended the State Rabbinical School (Rządowa Szkoła Rabinów) in the years 1826–1830. In 1829 he began his career as a publisher, starting with translations of popular French novels. As his business grew, he became one of the most prominent publishers in Warsaw. His printing enterprise included "a printing shop, font casting shop, bindery, and stereotyping shop", and was seen as the most advanced in contemporary Poland. His works were respected for their high language and technical quality. In 1836 he opened his bookstore in Warsaw, which also served as a library; later he would open another store in Suwałki. In 1842 he founded a magazine for peasants, Kmiotek (The Peasant), and published it until 1850.

Orgelbrand published many works of literature (notably, about 30 titles of Józef Ignacy Kraszewski), including translations, as well as scholarly works, such as Starożytna Polska (Ancient Poland) by M. Baliński and T. Lipiński (4 volumes), Pomnik do historii obyczajow w Polsce (Memorial to the History of Customs in Poland) by J. I. Kraszewski, Piśmiennictwo Polski (Polish Writing) by W. A. Maciejowski (3 volumes), and Biblioteka starożytnych pisarzy polskich (Library of Ancient Polish Authors) by K. W. Woycicki (6 volumes). Of his scholarly titles, the most famous was his encyclopedia project. Beginning in 1858 he assembled a group of "leading Polish scientists and writers" to produce the Encyklopedia Powszechna (Universal Encyclopedia), a 10-year, 28-volume project. (The work would also be known as Orgelbrand's Encyclopedia). It is regarded as the first modern Polish encyclopedia. The work on the encyclopedia was continued by his sons, Hipolit Orgelbrand and Mieczysław Hipolit, who published two abridged editions in 1872-1876 and 1879. In 1896–1897 his sons renamed the publishing company as Towarzystwo Akcyjne S. Orgelbranda Synow (Joint Stock Company of S. Orgelbrand's Sons). In 1919 the business was sold to Kozianski Printers of Kraków.

Orgelbrand is credited with publishing at least 300 titles and perhaps as many as 600 titles (according to a different count, over 250 titles in 520 volumes); most in the Polish language but about 100 in Hebrew, such as the Mishna, Gemara, Pentateuch and prayer books. He also published several books in Yiddish, such as an edition of Tseno Ureno. One of his most notable Hebrew titles was a 20-volume Babylonian Talmud (1859–1864). It was the commercial success of the Talmud title, of which 12,000 copies were sold, that allowed him to underwrite the costly encyclopedia project. He reaped significant profits by publishing Jewish titles in Congress Poland, which had fewer restrictions than the Russian Empire yet maintained favorable trade agreements with the latter.

== Other activities ==
Orgelbrand was a member of the board of executives for both the Jewish community administration and the Jewish hospital of Warsaw. On the political scene, he supported the assimilation of Jews into the Polish society.

He died in 1868 in Warsaw. He is buried at the Jewish Cemetery in Warsaw.

In 2010 he was named as the patron of World Book Day in Poland, and a square in Warsaw was named after him.
