= Bródno Jewish Cemetery =

Cemetery in Warsaw, Poland

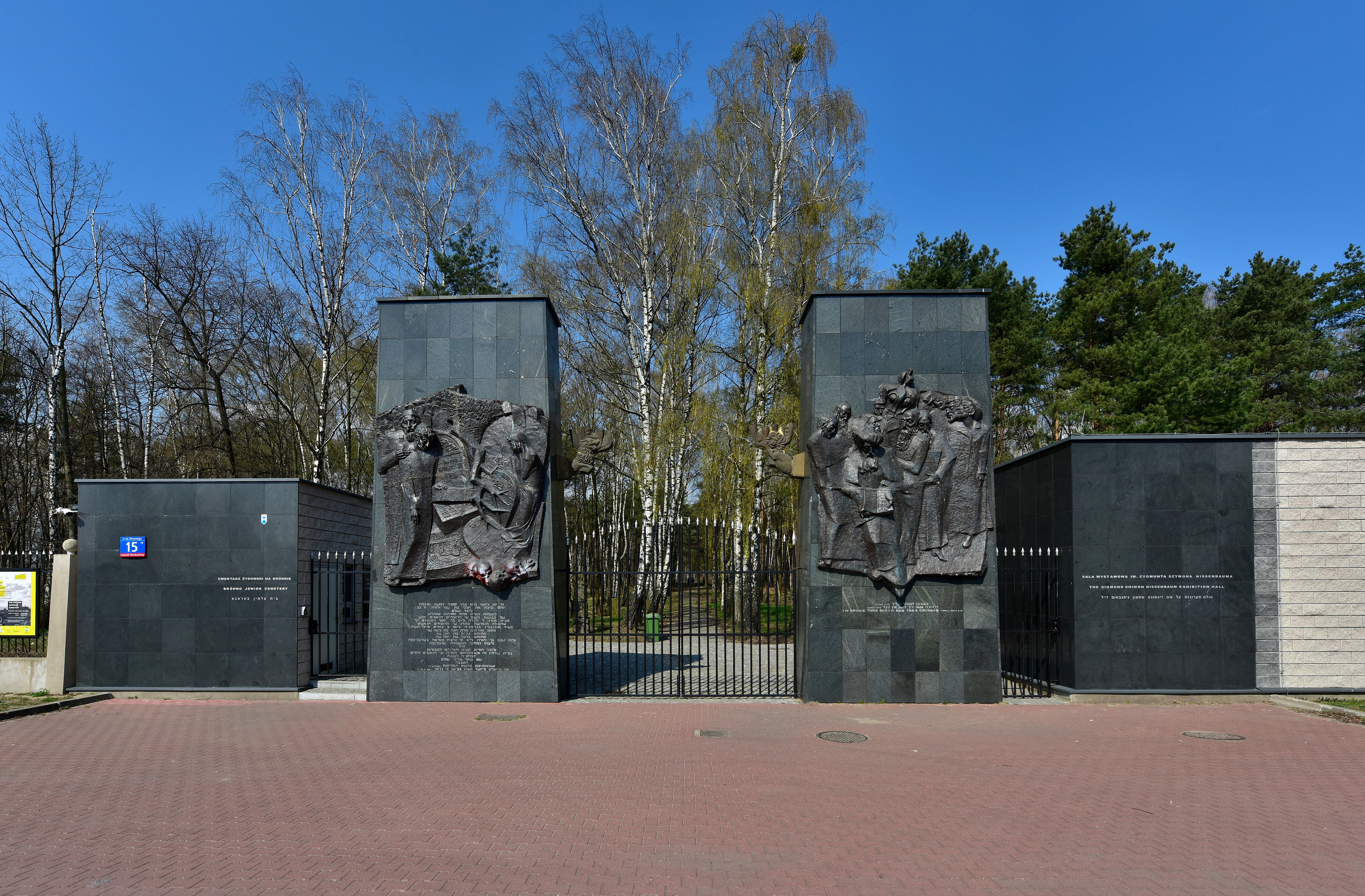
- Entrance to the cemetery
- Interactive map of Bródno Jewish Cemetery

Details
- Established: 1780
- Location: Warsaw, Poland
- Country: Poland
- Coordinates: 52°16′13″N 21°02′18″E
- Type: Jewish cemetery
- Size: 5 ha
- No. of graves: 3,000

Bródno Jewish Cemetery (also known as the Jewish Cemetery in Praga) is one of several Jewish cemeteries of Warsaw in Poland. The cemetery is located in the district of Targówek (near the better known district of Praga, and within Praga's unofficial neighborhood). The cemetery has been founded in 1780. It occupies an area of 5 hectares (12 acres).

Approximately 300,000 people are presumed to have been buried there, though only about 3,000 graves (tombstones) are preserved to this day.

It is the largest Jewish cemetery in Warsaw. It is also said to be one of the largest Jewish cemeteries in Europe.

== History ==
The cemetery was opened in 1780 by Szmul Zbytkower, a Polish Jewish merchant and financier, who donated the land for that purpose (though he benefited from selling burial rights and other "arbitrary exactions" afterward). By mid-19th century the cemetery has grown to 18 ha. Since the 1870s the cemetery was administered by the local Jewish council, which refocused it on the burials of impoverished Jewry; this marked the beginning of the deterioration of the facilities.

The cemetery suffered from a lot of destruction during the occupation of Poland by Nazi Germany in World War II, both due to the German administration's purposeful use of the cemetery as a source of building material and due to collateral damage from the war. After the war it was the site of the mass burial of Jewish fatalities exhumed during the rebuilding of Warsaw; it was officially closed in 1950. It has suffered from continued deterioration since, receiving negligible support from the local administration. The cemetery was administered by the Nissenbaum Foundation from 1984 to 2010.

The cemetery is occasionally vandalized, and criminal incidents (robberies) have been known to happen there. This has caused activists and members of community to demand that the cemetery, designed as a monument in 2009, should be better protected. City council representatives in 2010 noted that their first priority is protecting the cemetery from vandalism, and restoration is secondary to that.

As of 2010, the Nissenbaum Foundation has stopped its involvement with the cemetery, and its legal status had to be determined by the court, with both the Warsaw City Council and the Jewish Community of Warsaw showing interest in administering the land. In 2012 the cemetery was passed to the Jewish Community of Warsaw which wants to start a new renovation program in the near future.

== Famous burials ==
- Abraham Stern, inventor of mechanical calculators
- Szmul Zbytkower

== See also ==
- Bródno Cemetery
- History of Jews in Poland
- Okopowa Street Jewish Cemetery
