= Hayyim Selig Slonimski =

Hebrew astronomer and mathematician (1810–1904)

Ḥayyim Selig Slonimski
- חַיִּים זֶעלִיג בֶּן יַעֲקֹב סלאָנימסקי
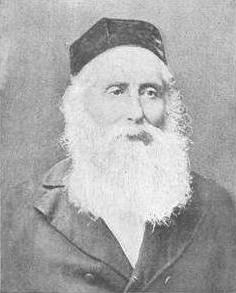
- Ḥayyim Selig Slonimski
- Born: March 31, 1810; Bialystok, Russian Empire (present-day Poland)
- Died: May 15, 1904 (aged 94); Warsaw, Kingdom of Poland
- Resting place: Okopowa Street Jewish Cemetery
- Spouses: Reiza Rivhas Neches (m. 1828; div. 1836) Sara Gitel Stern (m. 1842; died 1897)
- Relatives: Antoni Słonimski (grandson), Mikhail Slonimsky (grandson), Nicolas Slonimsky (grandson)
- Writing career
- Notable works: Mosedei Ḥokmah, Sefer Kukba di-Shebit, Toledot ha-Shamayim
- Notable awards: Demidov Prize (1844)

Ḥayyim Selig ben Ya'akov Slonimski (Yiddish: חַיִּים זֶעלִיג בֶּן יַעֲקֹב סלאָנימסקי; March 31, 1810 – May 15, 1904), also known by his acronym ḤaZaS (חז״ס), was a Hebrew publisher, mathematician, astronomer, inventor, science writer, and rabbi. He was among the first to write books on science for a broad Jewish audience, and was the founder of Ha-Tsfira, the first Hebrew-language newspaper with an emphasis on the sciences.

== Biography ==
Ḥayyim Selig Slonimski was born in Bialystok, in the Grodno Governorate of the Russian Empire (present-day Poland), the oldest son of Rabbi Avraham Ya'akov Bishka and Leah (Neches) Bishka. His father belonged to a family of rabbis, writers, publishers and printers, and his mother was the daughter of Rabbi Yeḥiel Neches, an owner of a well-known beit midrash in Bialystok. Slonimski had a traditional Jewish upbringing and Talmudic education; without a formal secular education, Slonimski taught himself mathematics, astronomy, and foreign languages.

An advocate for the education of Eastern European Jews in the sciences, Slonimski introduced a vocabulary of technical terms created partly by himself into the Hebrew language. At age 24 he finished writing a textbook on mathematics, but due to lack of funds, only the first part of which was published in 1834 under the title Mosedei Ḥokhmah. The following year, Slonimski released Sefer Kokhva de-Shavit (1835), a collection of essays on Halley's Comet and other astronomy-related topics such as the laws of Kepler and Newton's laws of motion.

In 1838 Slonimski settled in Warsaw, where he became acquainted with mathematician and inventor Abraham Stern (1768–1842), whose youngest daughter Sarah Gitel he would later marry in 1842. There he published another astronomical work, the highly popular Toldot ha-Shamayim (1838).

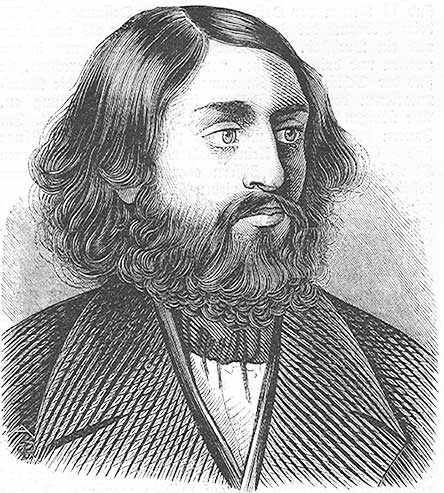
Slonimski in the 1840s

He also tried his hand at the applied sciences, and a number of his technological inventions received recognition and awards. The most notable of his inventions was his calculating machine, created in 1842 based on his tables, which he exhibited to the St. Petersburg Academy of Sciences, and for which he was awarded the 1844 Demidov Prize of 2,500 rubles by the Russian Academy of Sciences. He also received a title of honorary citizen, which granted him the right to live outside of the Pale of Settlement to which Jews were normally restricted. In 1844 he published a new formula in Crelle's Journal for calculating the Jewish calendar. In 1853 he invented a chemical process for plating iron vessels with lead to prevent corrosion, and in 1856 a device for simultaneously sending multiple telegrams using just one telegraphic wire. The system of multiple telegraphy perfected by Lord Kelvin in 1858 was based on Slonimski's discovery.

Slonimski lived between 1846 and 1858 in Tomaszów Mazowiecki, an industrial town in central Poland. He corresponded with several scientists, notably Alexander von Humboldt, and wrote a sketch of Humboldt's life.

In February 1862 in Warsaw, Slonimski launched Ha-Tsfira, the first Hebrew newspaper in Poland, and was the publisher, editor, and chief contributor. It ceased publication after six months due to his departure on the eve of the January Uprising from Warsaw to Zhitomir, the capital of the Ukrainian province Volhynia. There Slonimski was appointed as principal of the rabbinical seminary in Zhitomir and as government censor of Hebrew books. After the seminary was closed by the Russian government in 1874, Slonimski resumed the publication of Ha-Tsfira, first in Berlin and then again in Warsaw, after he obtained the necessary permission from the tsarist government. The newspaper would quickly become a central cultural institution of Polish Jewry.

He died in Warsaw on May 15, 1904.

== The Stalin controversy ==
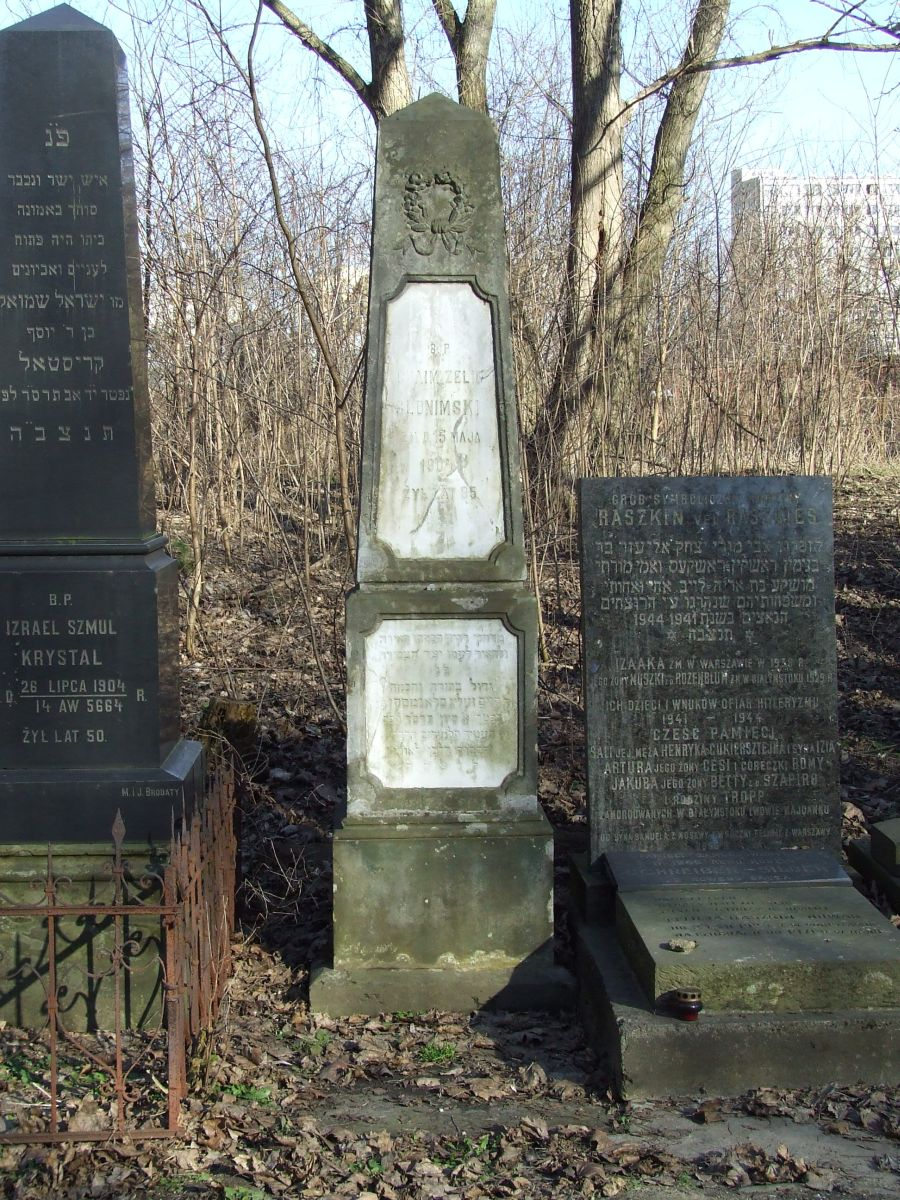
Slonimski's grave at Warsaw Jewish Cemetery

In 1952 Josef Stalin made a speech in which, among other things, he claimed that it was a Russian who had beat out America in the 19th century in the development of the telegraph. While Stalin's claim was mocked in the United States, Slonimsky's grandson, the musicologist Nicolas Slonimsky, was able to confirm the accuracy of some of Stalin's claims.

== Major works ==
- Mosede Ḥokmah (1834), on the fundamental principles of higher algebra
- Sefer Kukba di-Shebit (1835), essays on the Halley comet and on astronomy in general
- Toledot ha-Shamayim (1838), on astronomy and optics
- Yesode ha-'Ibbur (1852), on the Jewish calendar system and its history
- Meẓi'ut ha-Nefesh ve-Ḳiyyumah (1852), on the immortality of the soul
- Ot Zikkaron (1858), a biographical sketch of Alexander von Humboldt

== See also ==
- Slonimski's Theorem
