= Franciscan Sisters of the Family of Mary =

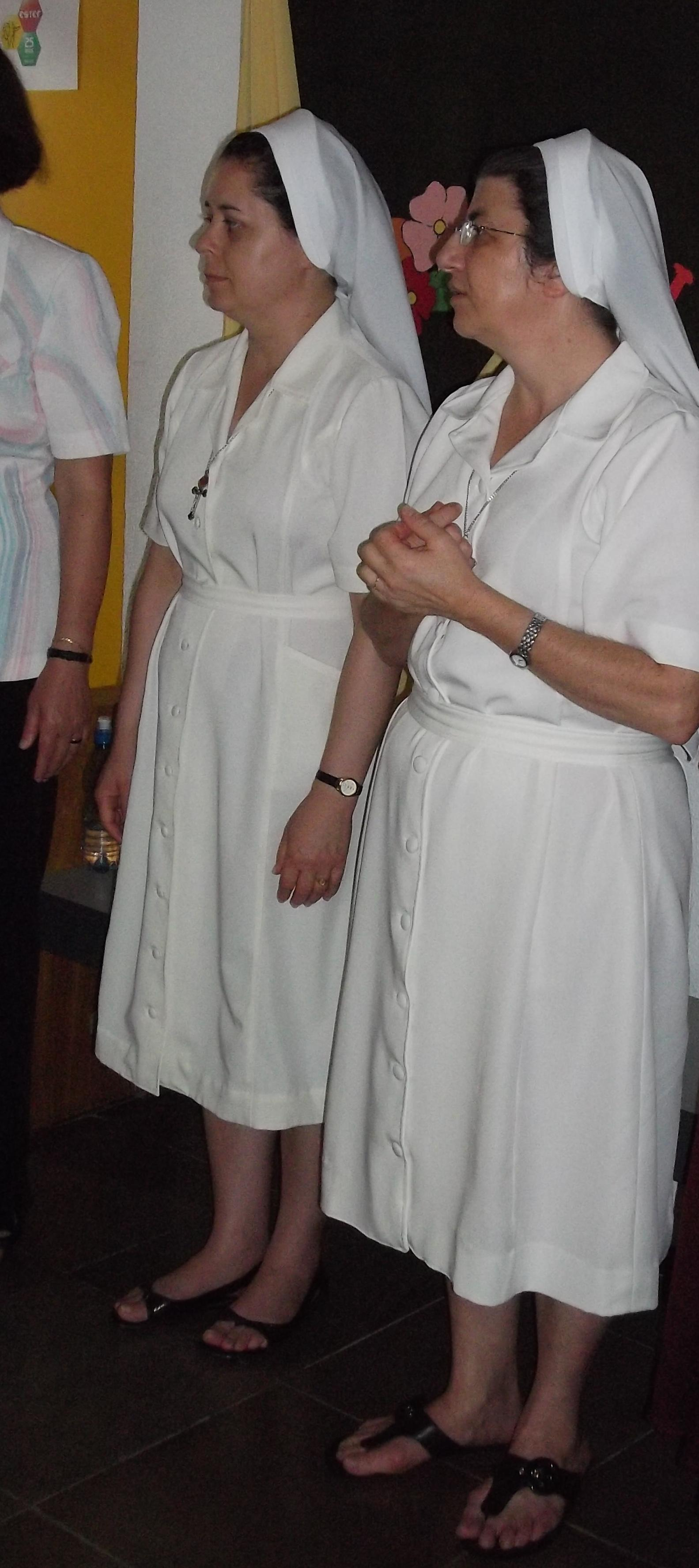
Franciscan Sisters of the Family of Mary in Brazil

The Franciscan Sisters of the Family of Mary, (Polish: Zgromadzenie Sióstr Franciszkanek Rodziny Maryi; Latin: Congregatio Sororum Franciscalium Familiae Mariae), also known as Siostry Rodziny Maryi, RM, is a Polish female religious institute. The congregation was established in St. Petersburg during the Partitions of Poland with the mission to help Polish children stricken by hunger in the Russian Empire, and to save the impoverished Catholic parishes persecuted by the Tsarist authorities. The congregation was founded in 1857 by the Warsaw archbishop, Zygmunt Szczęsny Feliński, who was beatified by John Paul II during his last pilgrimage to Poland in 2002, and canonized by Benedict XVI in 2009. The sisters base their life on the Franciscan ideals of service to God and to the common people, especially the poorest. The spirit of scarcity is evident in their own standard of life. Dwellings and rooms of the Sisters are furnished in such way as to make the poor and the rich feel humbled. The young postulants don't contribute dowries. The nuns wear black habits with a purple rope. In Poland the Sisters of the Family of Mary conduct educational activities in nursery schools and rehabilitation centres, help at children's homes as well as hospitals and care homes. They help disadvantaged and the homeless by running shelters. They also work in parishes as religion teachers, organists and assistants, as well as in seminaries.
