= Ha-Tsfira =

Hebrew-language newspaper

Ha-Tsfirah
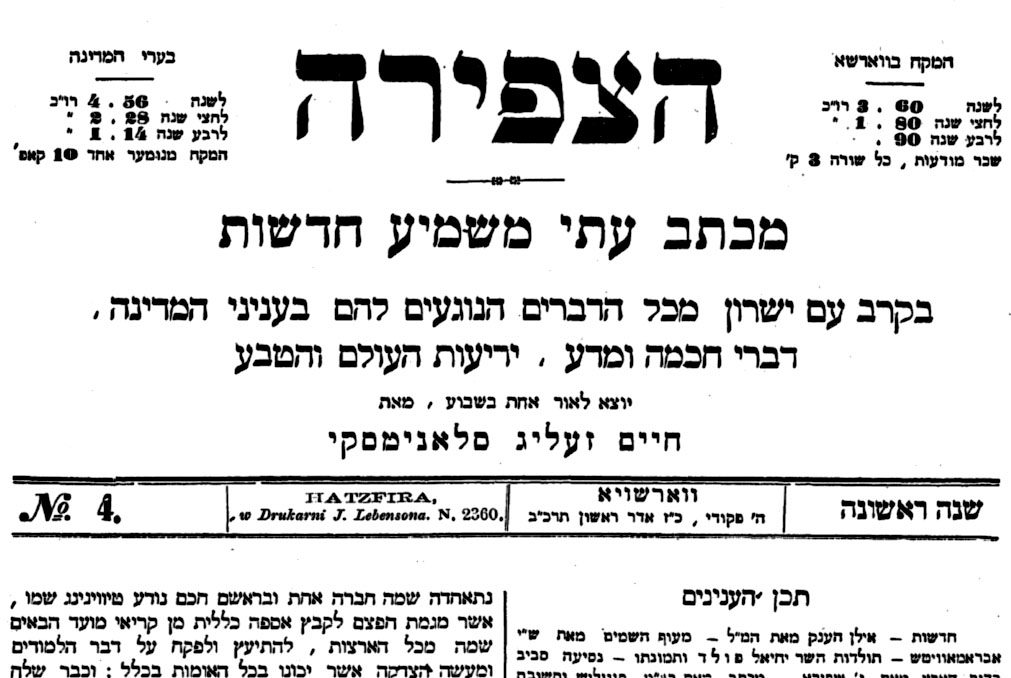
- Masthead of Ha-Tsfirah, 27 February 1862
- Founder: Chaim Selig Slonimski
- Founded: 1862, 1874
- Ceased publication: 1931
- Language: Hebrew
- Country: Poland
- Free online archives: Editions from the Historical Jewish Press

Ha-Tsfira (Hebrew: הצפירה) was a Hebrew-language newspaper published in Poland in 1862 and 1874–1931.

== History ==
The first issue of Ha-Tsfira appeared in Warsaw, Congress Poland, in 1862, edited by Chaim Selig Slonimski. Ha-Tsfira was the first Hebrew paper with an emphasis on the sciences.

The paper closed down after six months when Slonimski became principal of the rabbinical seminary in Zhytomyr, and the government began censorship of Hebrew books.

It reopened in 1874 in Berlin, and began to be published in Warsaw in September 1875. Coverage of news and politics was introduced after the First Zionist Congress. From 1886, the paper began to appear as a daily. The driving spirit behind this change was Slonimski's assistant, Nachum Sokolov, who was later appointed editor-in-chief.

Ha-Tsfira became part of a network of important Hebrew periodicals, among them Ha-Shahar, Ha-Asif, Ha-Shiloaḥ. Some of the greatest names in early modern Hebrew literature published their work in the paper, including Mendele Mocher Sforim, Y. L. Peretz, and Sholem Aleichem.
