= Nissenbaum =

Nissenbaum is a surname. Notable people with the surname include:

- Helen Nissenbaum (born 1954), privacy and computer law scholar
- Henry Nissen (born 1948 as Henry Nissenbaum), German/Australian boxer of the 1970s
- Jesse Nissenbaum, American singer/songwriter
