= Kazimierz Kaszewski =

Polish educator

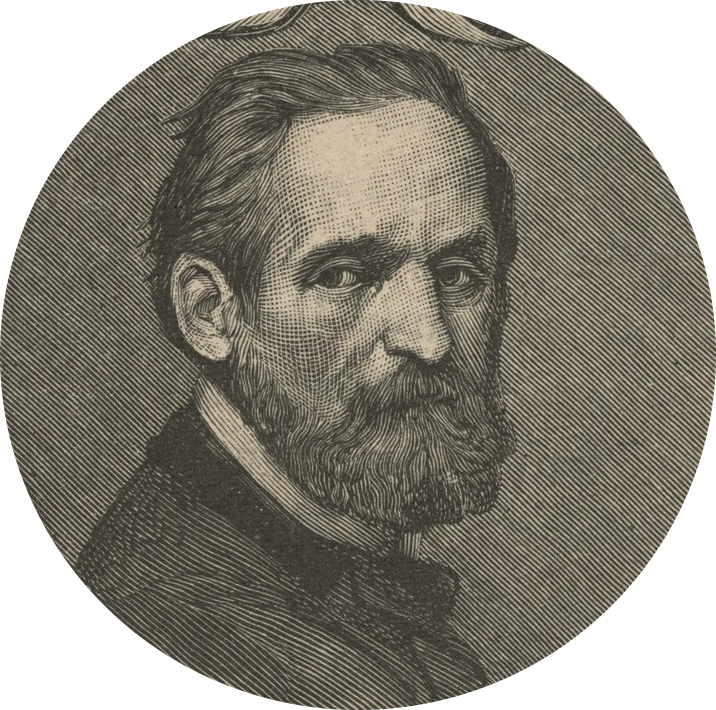
Kazimierz Kaszewski

Kazimierz Kaszewski (1825–1910) was a Polish educator.
