= Slonimski's Theorem =

Slonimski's Theorem is an observation by Hayyim Selig Slonimski that the sequence of carry digits in a multiplication table is the Farey sequence.

This observation allowed Slonimski to create very compact multiplication tables for use in hand calculations. He received several awards for different devices for presenting these tables. The most common format were Joffe Bars similar to Napier's Rods. Joffe Bars were popular in Eastern Europe in the late 19th and early 20th century.
