= Yaakov Gesundheit =

Chief rabbi of Warsaw (1815–1878)

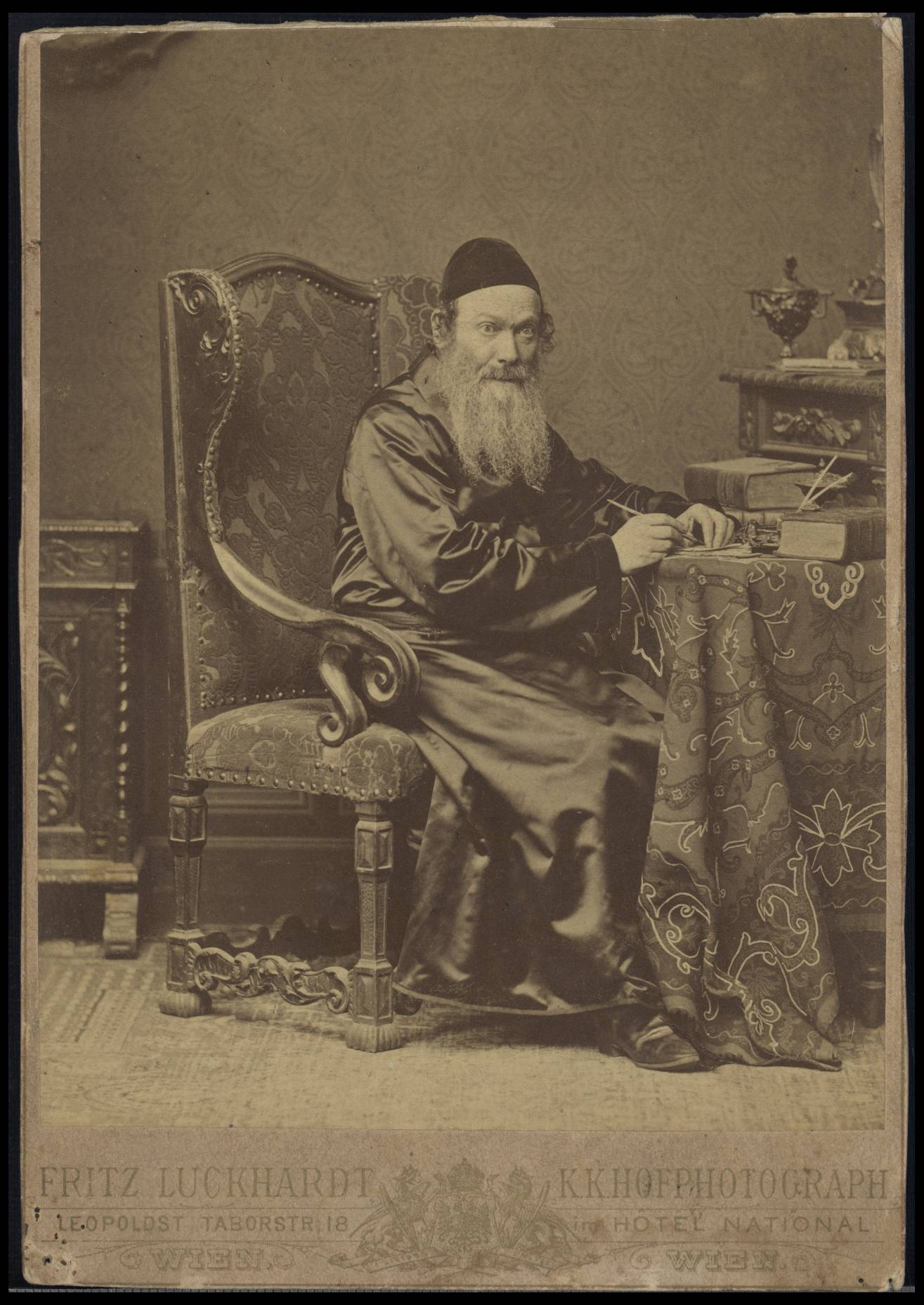
Jacob Gesundheit

Rabbi Yaakov Gesundheit (1815–1878) was the chief rabbi of Warsaw from 1870 to about 1874.

He conducted a yeshivah for forty-two years; some of his many pupils becoming well-known rabbis. In 1870 he was chosen rabbi of Warsaw and held the office for about four years, when he was compelled to relinquish it on account of not being acceptable to the chasidim.

He finished Sifte Kohen at the age of eighteen. At twenty-three he wrote Tiferet Yaakov, on Shulchan Aruch Choshen Mishpat (Warsaw, 1842), but almost all copies were destroyed by order of the censor.

His other published works also bear the same name, Tiferet Yaakov, and comprise commentary and novellae on Shulchan Aruch and on the Talmudic tractates Gittin (ib. 1858) and Chullin (ib. 1867). These works remain popular today. He also left several works in manuscript.

His grandnephew was the financial analyst Benjamin Graham.

== Notes ==
Preceded by Dow Ber Meisels	Chief Rabbi of Warsaw; 1870–1874	Succeeded by None (but Yitzchok Feigenbaum was appointed "Av Beit Din" in place of the office of Chief Rabbi)
