= Dow Ber Meisels =

Polish chief rabbi (1798–1870)

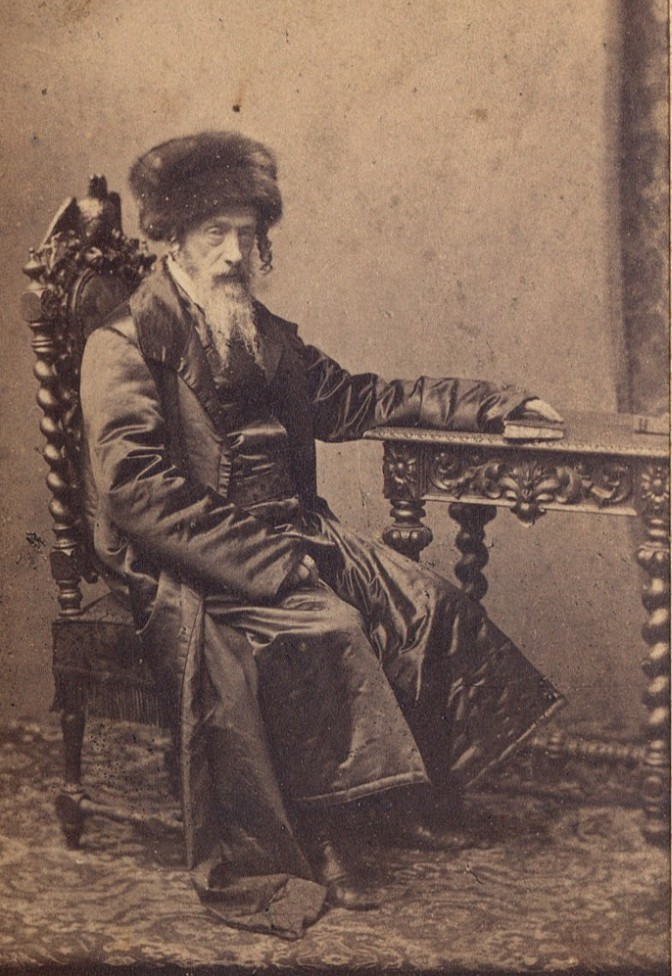
1861 portrait of Rabbi Meisels by Karol Beyer

Dow (Dov, Dob) Ber (Beer, Berisz, Berush) Meisels (1798 – 17 March 1870) was a Chief Rabbi of Kraków (Cracow) from 1832 and later, Chief Rabbi of Warsaw (from 1856). He was active in the Polish nationalist movement, and was a politician in the Austrian partition of Poland and (later) in the Russian partition. A vocal supporter of Polish-Jewish cooperation, he supported the cause of Polish independence, for which he was persecuted by the Russian government.

== Biography ==
Dow Ber Meisels was the son of Isaac from the Silesian town of Szczekociny, and a descendant of Mordecai Maisel of Prague, though the Meisels family came from Kraków's Jewish community; he also lived as a youth in Kamianets-Podilskyi, where his father was a rabbi. After marrying the daughter of the wealthy Solomon Bornstein of Wieliczka, he settled as a banker and rabbi in Kraków. He supported the cause of Polish independence, providing weapons for the insurgents in the November Uprising; some sources even describe him as a Polish patriot or nationalist. In 1832 he would become Kraków's Chief Rabbi, though he was not recognized by the entire community, a considerable part of which adhered to his opponent, Saul Landau. He occupied the Kraków rabbinate for nearly a quarter of a century.

Meisels always took a conspicuous part in the civic life of his place of residence; and in the stormy times of 1846 (see Kraków Uprising) he was chosen one of the twelve senators of the Kraków city council. In 1848 he was elected, with the aid of Catholic votes, to represent the city in the provisional Austrian Reichsrath (Austrian parliament), meeting at Kremsier, Vienna. He took his seat among the radicals, and when the president expressed his surprise at seeing a rabbi seated on the "left," Meisels replied, "Juden haben keine Rechte" ("Jews have no right").

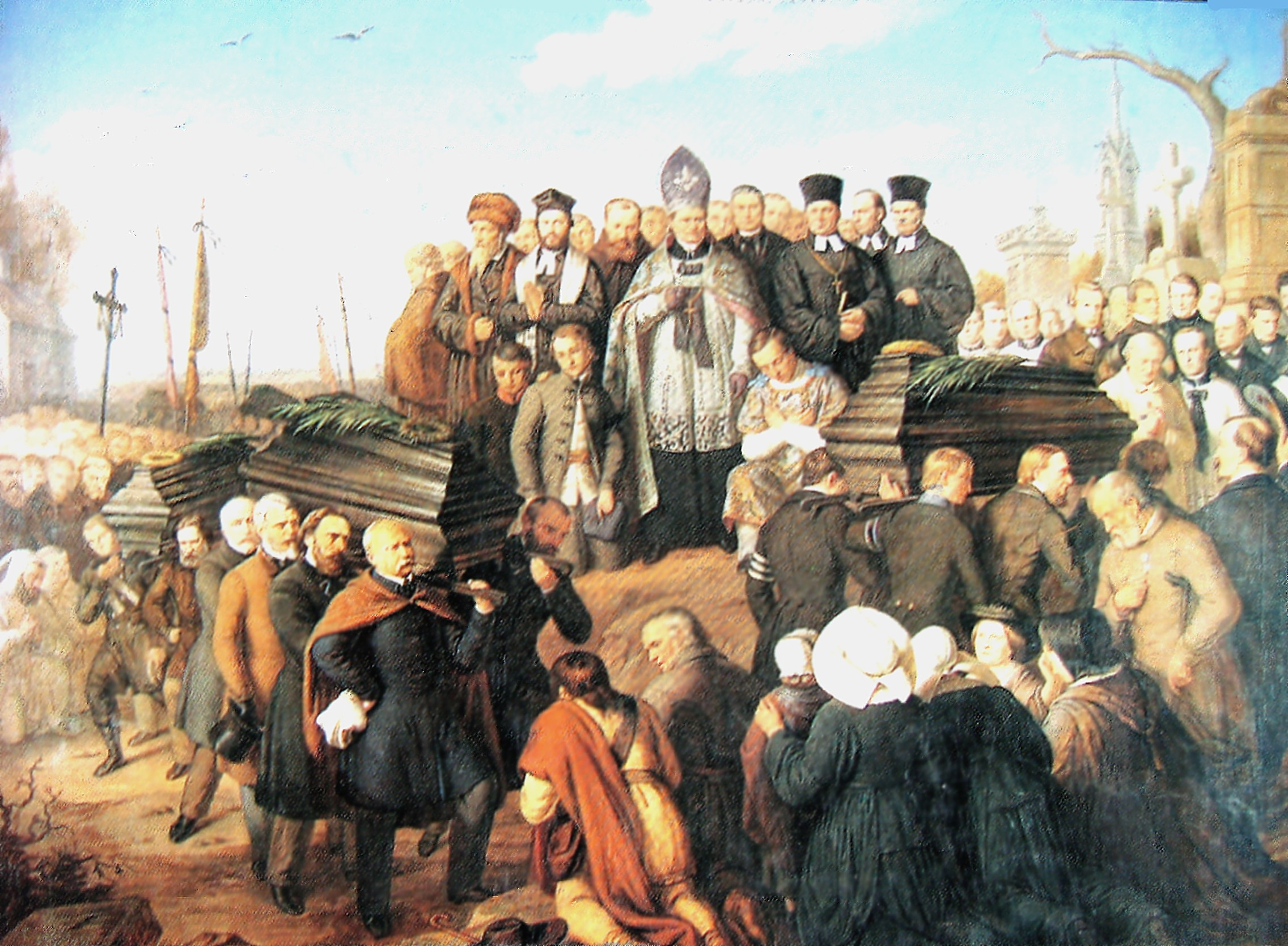
Funeral of five Polish demonstrators, Warsaw, 1861, by Aleksander Lesser (1818-1884). Rabbi Meisels is at top left among the clergy.

In 1856 Meisels became rabbi of Warsaw (in the Russian-ruled sector of Poland), where he soon won the respect and confidence of the entire population. In 1861, during the riots and excesses that preceded the January 1863 Uprising, he did all in his power to induce the Jews to sympathize with the Polish cause. He accompanied the Archbishop of Warsaw at the funeral of victims of the first disturbances and marched with Father Wyszyński at the head of a delegation to city hall. Later he was appointed by the Russian vice-regent a member of Warsaw's provisional municipal council; but he remained loyal to the Polish patriotic cause, which likely protected Warsaw's Jewish population by improving their relations with the Polish community.

For his support of Polish demonstrators, in 1861 he was arrested by the Russians and expelled from the city. Meisels was invited to settle in London; but in 1862 he was permitted to return to Warsaw, where he remained until his death. Meisels actively aided the Polish January 1863 Uprising, supporting it in his speeches and organizing financial aid for the insurgents. For this he was again expelled by the Russian authorities, this time for several years. After his return, he would be under constant supervision by the Russians.

He died in Warsaw on 17 March 1870. After his funeral, which turned into a large Polish-Jewish anti-Russian demonstration, the Russian government forbade obituaries of him to be printed.

Meisels was the author of novellæ on the Sefer ha-Miẓwot of Maimonides, which appeared together with the text as Ḥiddushe MaHaRDaM. One of his sons, Israel Meisels, was dayyan in Kraków and rabbi of Siedlce, Poland, from 1858 to 1867. A second son, Salomon Meisels, lived in Vienna.

Preceded by Chaim Davidsohn	Chief Rabbi of Warsaw; 1856 – 1861	Succeeded by Yaakov Gesundheit
