= Jesse Nissenbaum =

American singer-songwriter

- Origin: Long Island, New York, United States
- Genres: Alternative rock, reggae, ska, acoustic
- Years active: 2001–present
- Label: Indy

Jesse Nissenbaum is an American singer/songwriter from Long Island, New York. He is currently lead singer and guitarist in Long Island rock band Hazmat Bay. Jesse combines music of alternative, acoustic, blues, ska, reggae and rock. Jesse Nissenbaum played all of the instruments on all of his solo work before Hazmat Bay started in 2007.

== Biography ==
Jesse grew up in the Long Island village of Lindenhurst. At a very young age he took to music, particularly the guitar. He learned a bevy of instruments, which would later help him begin his musical career.

In 2001, Jesse was introduced to the music of sublime. From there on, reggae and ska were almost always present in his music. Jesse also cites the work of Stevie Ray Vaughan, Jeff Buckley, and Chris Cornell as his major inspirations.

After writing close to 40 songs between 2002 and 2005, Jesse Decided to enter this studio for the much anticipated debut EP "What it Seems". The EP was released in 2007.

After the release of What it Seems, Jesse re-entered the studio in fall 2008 to work on the Hazmat Bay album titled "The Red Tide". The Red Tide came out in June 2009. Hazmat Bay did a small west coast tour in support of "The Red Tide" in August 2009.

April 20, 2011 Saw the release of Hazmat Bay, a 12-track album recorded at Sound Room Studios in Babylon NY. Following the release Jesse recruited guitarist/bassist Chris Cochrane to the mix as a permanent member. They toured California and Nevada during January 2012 acoustic, after the departure of drummer Rob Capace only weeks before the tour. The band has more tentative plans for a fall 2012 north east tour, and January Florida/Gulf Coast tour.

Jesse cites his family as his biggest inspiration for his music. His mother is a singer/songwriter, Teri Salvo Nissenbaum, and still performs out and his father worked with many bands in the 1980s including Kiss, Ted Nugent and others. Also, Jesse's brother Jeremy was the drummer of Extreme Metal band Lecherous Nocturne and is an established musician in his own right, gaining acclaim throughout the metal scene.

== Discography ==
=== Albums and demos ===
2006- Demo
2007- What it Seems EP
2007- What it Seems Full Length Album
2009- The Red Tide (Hazmat Bay)
2011- Self Titled (Hazmat Bay)

== Singles ==
Year	Song	Album
2007	What it Seems	What it Seems EP
2009	The Red Tide	The Red Tide
2011	Exodub	Hazmat Bay
2011	Bad Card	Hazmat Bay
2012	Norml	Hazmat Bay
