= Jewish cemeteries of Warsaw =

The bottom left black & white picture shows bodies below a stone lattice work. The stone lattice work is visible between two marker stones in the colour picture.

Jewish cemeteries of Warsaw refers to a number of Jewish necropolises in the city.

== Okopowa Street Jewish Cemetery ==
The board at the entrance that shows the structure and history of the Okopowa Street cemetery

Okopowa Street Jewish Cemetery is one of the largest Jewish cemeteries in Europe. Located on Okopowa Street and abutting the Powązki Cemetery, the Jewish Cemetery was established in 1806 and occupies 33 hectares (83 acres) of land.

It is now the site of numerous overgrown and abandoned graves and crypts, having fallen in disrepair after the Nazi invasion of Poland and subsequent Holocaust. Although it was closed down during World War II, after the war it was reopened and a small portion of it remains active, serving Warsaw's small remaining Jewish population.

== Bródno Jewish Cemetery ==
Bródno Jewish Cemetery was once much bigger than the earlier cemetery and served both the Jews of the right-bank borough of Praga and poorer Jews of other boroughs of the city of Warsaw. After the Okopowa Street cemetery became overcrowded, the Praga cemetery was intended as the main Jewish cemetery. However, after the German occupation of Poland in 1939 and the start of the Holocaust, most of it was demolished and the headstones were used as street pavement. After the war the remaining tombstones were recovered from various towns in Poland and moved back to the cemetery. Currently it is inactive and serves as a monument only.

== Nowa Jerozolima Cemetery ==
Nowa Jerozolima (New Jerusalem) Cemetery was a cemetery of one of the numerous Jewish villages founded in the area of the Polish capital in the 17th and 18th centuries. It was closed down in late 18th century and the village itself was incorporated into Warsaw to become the namesake of Aleje Jerozolimskie, one of Warsaw's principal streets. In early 19th century, during the Austrian occupation of Warsaw, the cemetery was closed down and the ashes were moved to cemetery in Powązki.

== See also ==
- History of the Jews in Poland
