= Abraham Stern (inventor) =

18th to 19th century Polish inventor

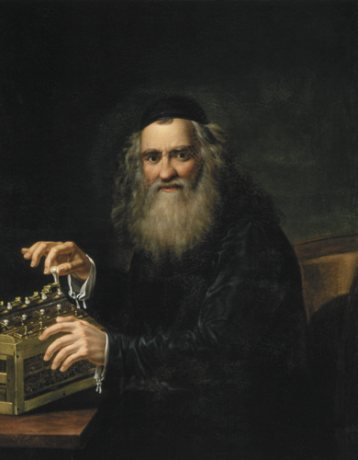
- Portrait of Stern by Antoni Blank (1823)
- Born: Abraham Jacob Stern; 1762 or 1769; Hrubieszów, Lublin Voivodeship, Polish–Lithuanian Commonwealth
- Died: 3 February 1842; Warsaw, Congress Poland
- Burial place: Bródno Jewish Cemetery, Warsaw
- Relatives: Ḥayyim Zelig Slonimski (son-in-law)

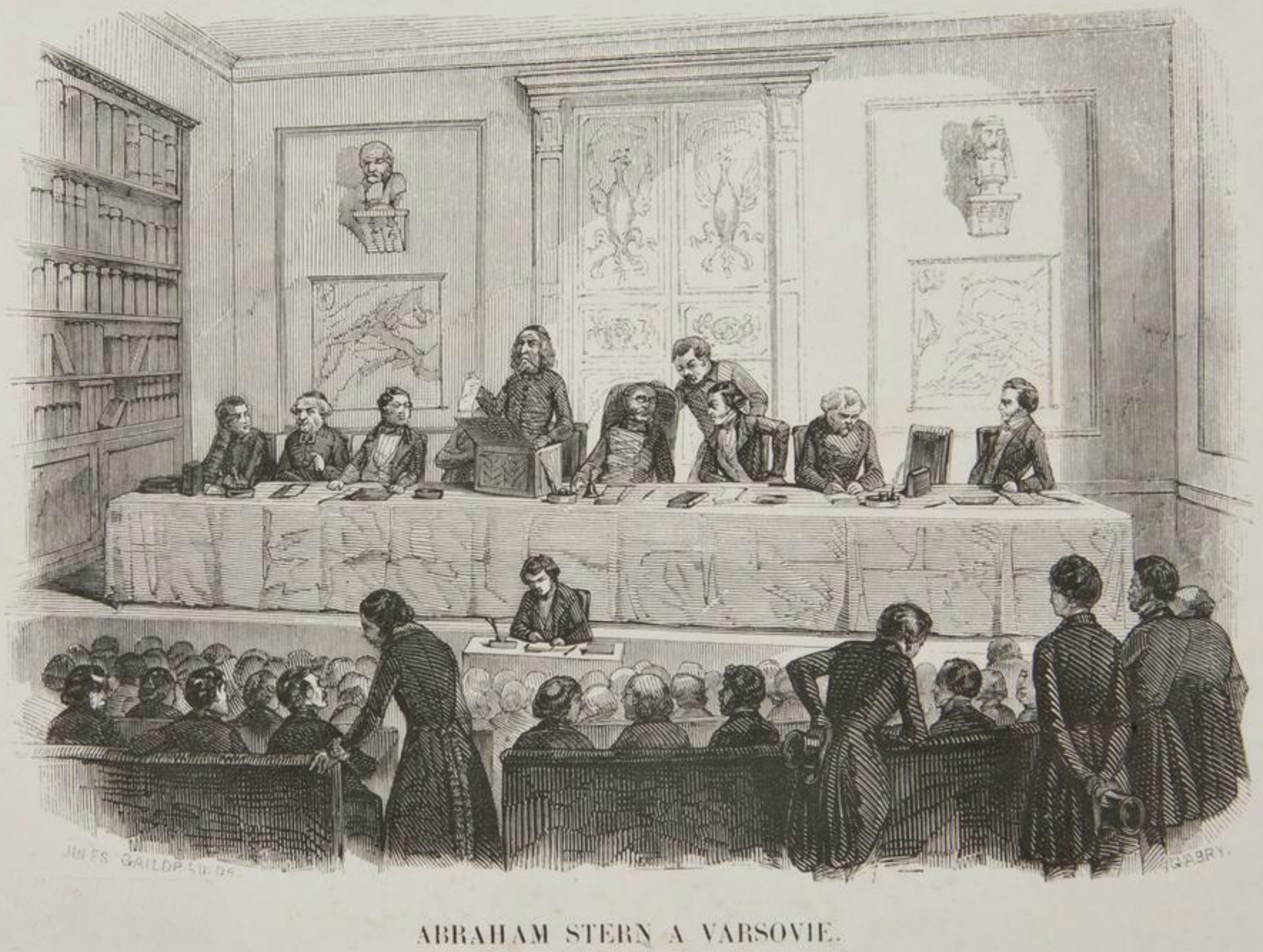
Abraham Stern demonstrating one of his calculating machines in Warsaw

Abraham Jacob Stern (Yiddish: אברהם יעקב שטערן; 1762 or 1769 – 3 February 1842) was a Polish Jewish maskil, inventor, educator, and poet. He is known for his mechanical calculators.

== Biography ==
Abraham Stern was born in Hrubieszow to poor Jewish parents Miriam Liba (née Halpern) and Menachem Mendel Stern (né Morgenstern). He received a traditional Jewish education, and trained as a watchmaker. His natural aptitude in the study of philosophy, languages, and mathematics was discovered by reformer Stanisław Staszic, who invited him to Warsaw to continue his studies.

His first major invention was a mechanical calculator, perfected in 1817, which could calculate the square roots of numbers. This attracted wide attention, and led to his being elected in 1817 the first Jewish member of the Warsaw Society of the Friends of Science. In 1816, and again in 1818, he was presented to Tsar Alexander I, who granted him an annual pension of 350 rubles from the state treasury, promising, in case of his death, to pay half of this sum to his widow. Encouraged by his friends, Stern developed a topographical wagon for the measurement of level surfaces, an invention of great value to both civil and military engineers. The committee appointed by the academy to examine this invention reported very favorably upon it. Stern rendered great services to agriculture by his improvements in the construction of thrashing and harvesting machines, as well as by his invention of a new form of sickle.

Stern always remained an Orthodox Jew; he wore a kippah in the presence of his eminent friends, and when staying in the castle of Adam Czartoryski, a Jewish cook prepared his meals. He was also a known opponent of Hasidic Judaism. Stern took an active interest in educational affairs, and accepted the post of inspector of Jewish schools and that of censor of Hebrew texts. The rabbinical school in Warsaw was organized according to the plan suggested by him while a member of the Komitet Starozakonnych (Jewish Advisory Council to the Committee for Jewish Affairs).

His official duties, however, did not prevent him from making contributions to Hebrew literature. He wrote an ode in honor of the coronation of Nicholas I, which appeared in Hebrew under the title "Rinnah u-tefillah" ("Song and Prayer," 1925) and was translated into Polish by J. Gluegenberg (Warsaw, 1829). He wrote also "Shirim" ("Poems"), which appeared in the Shire musar haskel collection (Warsaw, 1835).
