= Brian Marcus =

American mathematician

Brian Marcus is an American-born mathematician who works in Canada. He is a professor in the department of mathematics at the University of British Columbia (UBC), where he is the site director of the Pacific Institute for the Mathematical Sciences (PIMS), a fellow of the AMS and the IEEE. He was the department head of mathematics at UBC from 2002 to 2007 and the deputy director of PIMS from 2016 to 2018.

== Education and academic career ==
Marcus earned his Ph.D. in 1975 from the University of California, Berkeley (UC Berkeley); his supervisor was Rufus Bowen. He then worked as an IBM Watson Postdoctoral Fellow, an associate professor at UNC Chapel Hill and a researcher at IBM Research – Almaden. He additionally held visiting associate professor positions at UC Berkeley, University of California, Santa Cruz, and Stanford University. From 2016 to 2018, he was the deputy director of the Pacific Institute for the Mathematical Sciences, where, as of 2019, he is the UBC Site Director. He is one of the representatives of the Pacific Rim Mathematical Association.

His main areas of research are ergodic theory, symbolic dynamics and information theory. He has published contributions in the theory of horocycle flows and entropy. Marcus has written over seventy research papers, some of them published in Annals of Mathematics, Inventiones Mathematicae and Journal of the AMS. His collaborators include Wolfgang Krieger, Roy Adler, Rufus Bowen, Dominique Perrin, Jack Wolf, Yuval Peres and Sheldon Newhouse. Marcus (with Doug Lind) wrote the book An Introduction to Symbolic Dynamics and Coding (currently with more than 3,000 citations on Google Scholar), and (with Susan Williams) the Scholarpedia article on symbolic dynamics.

In 1993, Marcus was awarded the Leonard J. Abraham Prize Paper award of the IEEE. In 1999, he was elected as a fellow of the IEEE. He was named a fellow of the American Mathematical Society in 2018; the citation was "For contributions to dynamical systems, symbolic dynamics and applications to data storage problems, and service to the profession."

== Selected publications ==
=== Books ===
- 1995: (with Doug Lind) An Introduction to Symbolic Dynamics and Coding, Cambridge University Press doi:10.1017/CBO9780511626302.

=== Research papers ===
- Ergodic properties of horocycle flows for surfaces of negative curvature, Annals of Mathematics 105 (1977), 81-105 doi:10.2307/1971026.
- with Rufus Bowen: Unique ergodicity of horocycle foliations, Israel Journal of Mathematics 26 (1977) 43-67 doi:10.1007/BF03007655.
- The horocycle flow is mixing of all degrees, Inventiones Mathematicae 46 (1978)201-209 doi:10.1007/BF01390274
- with Roy Adler: Topological entropy and equivalence of dynamical systems, Memoirs of the American Mathematical Society 219 (1979) doi:10.1090/memo/0219.
- Topological conjugacy of horocycle flows, American Journal of Mathematics (1983) 623-632 doi:10.2307/2374316
- with Selim Tuncel: Entropy at a weight-per-symbol and an imbedding theorem for Markov chains, Inventiones Mathematicae 102 (1990), 235-266 doi:10.1007/BF01233428.
- with Selim Tuncel: Matrices of polynomials, positivity, and finite equivalence of Markov chains, Journal of the American Mathematical Society 6 (1993), 131- 147 doi:10.1090/S0894-0347-1993-1168959-X.

== See also ==
- Daniel Rudolph – American mathematician, contemporary of Brian Marcus
