= Small boundary property =

In mathematics, the small boundary property is a property of certain topological dynamical systems. It is dynamical analog of the inductive definition of Lebesgue covering dimension zero.

== Definition ==
Consider the category of topological dynamical system (system in short) consisting of a compact metric space $X$ and a homeomorphism $T:X\rightarrow X$. A set $E\subset X$ is called small if it has vanishing orbit capacity, i.e., $\operatorname{ocap}(E) = 0$. This is equivalent to: $\forall\mu\in M_{T}(X),\ \mu(E)=0$ where $M_T(X)$ denotes the collection of $T$-invariant measures on $X$.

The system $(X,T)$ is said to have the small boundary property (SBP) if $X$ has a basis of open sets $\{O_i\}_{i=1}^\infty$ whose boundaries are small, i.e., $\operatorname{ocap}(\partial O_i)=0$ for all $i$.

== Can one always lower topological entropy? ==
Small sets were introduced by Michael Shub and Benjamin Weiss while investigating the question "can one always lower topological entropy?" Quoting from their article:

"For measure theoretic entropy, it is well known and quite easy to see that a positive entropy transformation always has factors of smaller entropy. Indeed the factor generated by a two-set partition with one of the sets having very small measure will always have small entropy. It is our purpose here to treat the analogous question for topological entropy... We will exclude the trivial factor, where it reduces to one point."

Recall that a system $(Y,S)$ is called a factor of $(X,T)$, alternatively $(X,T)$ is called an extension of $(Y,S)$, if there exists a continuous surjective mapping $\varphi:X\rightarrow Y$ which is eqvuivariant, i.e. $\varphi(Tx)=S\varphi(x)$ for all $x\in X$.

Thus Shub and Weiss asked: Given a system $(X,T)$ and $\varepsilon>0$, can one find a non-trivial factor $(Y,S)$ so that $\operatorname{h_{top}}(Y,S)<\varepsilon$?

Recall that a system $(X,T)$ is called minimal if it has no proper non-empty closed $T$-invariant subsets. It is called infinite if $|X|=\infty$.

Lindenstrauss introduced SBP and proved:

Theorem: Let $(X,T)$ be an extension of an infinite minimal system. The following are equivalent:

1. $(X,T)$ has the small-boundary property.
2. $\operatorname{mdim}(X,T)=0$, where $\operatorname{mdim}$ denotes mean dimension.
3. For every $\varepsilon>0$, $x\neq y\in X$, there exists a factor $\varphi_{xy}:(X,T)\rightarrow(Y_{xy},S)$ so $\varphi_{xy}(x) \neq\varphi_{xy}(y)$ and $\operatorname{h_{top}}(Y_{xy},S)<\varepsilon$.
4. $(X,T)=\varprojlim (X_i,T_i)$ where $\{ (X_i, T_i)\}_{i=1}^\infty$ is an inverse limit of systems with finite topological entropy $\operatorname{h_{top}}(X_i,T_i)<\infty$ for all $i$.

Later this theorem was generalized to the context of several commuting transformations by Gutman, Lindenstrauss and Tsukamoto.

== Systems with no non-trivial finite entropy factors ==
Let $X=[0,1]^{\mathbb{Z}}$ and $T:X\rightarrow X$ be the shift homeomorphism

$$(\ldots,x_{-2},x_{-1},\mathbf{x_0},x_1,x_2,\ldots)\rightarrow(\ldots,x_{-1},x_{0},\mathbf{x_1},x_2,x_3,\ldots).$$

This is the Baker's map, formulated as a two-sided shift. It can be shown that $(X,T)$ has no non-trivial finite entropy factors. One can also find minimal systems with the same property.
