= Universal space =

In mathematics, a universal space is a certain metric space that contains all metric spaces whose dimension is bounded by some fixed constant. A similar definition exists in topological dynamics.

== Definition ==
Given a class $\textstyle \mathcal{C}$ of topological spaces, $\textstyle \mathbb{U}\in\mathcal{C}$ is universal for $\textstyle \mathcal{C}$ if each member of $\textstyle \mathcal{C}$ embeds in $\textstyle \mathbb{U}$. Menger stated and proved the case $\textstyle d=1$ of the following theorem. The theorem in full generality was proved by Nöbeling.

Theorem: The $\textstyle (2d+1)$-dimensional cube $\textstyle [0,1]^{2d+1}$ is universal for the class of compact metric spaces whose Lebesgue covering dimension is less than $\textstyle d$.

Nöbeling went further and proved:

Theorem: The subspace of $\textstyle [0,1]^{2d+1}$ consisting of the set of points, at most $\textstyle d$ of whose coordinates are rational, is universal for the class of separable metric spaces whose Lebesgue covering dimension is less than $\textstyle d$.

The last theorem was generalized by Lipscomb to the class of metric spaces of weight $\textstyle \alpha$, $\textstyle \alpha>\aleph_{0}$: There exist a one-dimensional metric space $\textstyle J_{\alpha}$ such that the subspace of $\textstyle J_{\alpha}^{2d+1}$ consisting of set of points, at most $\textstyle d$ of whose coordinates are "rational" (suitably defined), is universal for the class of metric spaces whose Lebesgue covering dimension is less than $\textstyle d$ and whose weight is less than $\textstyle \alpha$.

== Universal spaces in topological dynamics ==
Consider the category of topological dynamical systems $\textstyle (X,T)$ consisting of a compact metric space $\textstyle X$ and a homeomorphism $\textstyle T:X\rightarrow X$. The topological dynamical system $\textstyle (X,T)$ is called minimal if it has no proper non-empty closed $\textstyle T$-invariant subsets. It is called infinite if $\textstyle |X|=\infty$. A topological dynamical system $\textstyle (Y,S)$ is called a factor of $\textstyle (X,T)$ if there exists a continuous surjective mapping $\textstyle \varphi:X\rightarrow Y$ which is equivariant, i.e. $\textstyle \varphi(Tx)=S\varphi(x)$ for all $\textstyle x\in X$.

Similarly to the definition above, given a class $\textstyle \mathcal{C}$ of topological dynamical systems, $\textstyle \mathbb{U}\in\mathcal{C}$ is universal for $\textstyle \mathcal{C}$ if each member of $\textstyle \mathcal{C}$ embeds in $\textstyle \mathbb{U}$ through an equivariant continuous mapping. Lindenstrauss proved the following theorem:

Theorem: Let $\textstyle d\in\mathbb{{N}}$. The compact metric topological dynamical system $\textstyle (X,T)$ where $\textstyle X=([0,1]^{d})^{\mathbb{{Z}}}$ and $\textstyle T:X\rightarrow X$ is the shift homeomorphism $\textstyle (\ldots,x_{-2},x_{-1},\mathbf{x_{0}},x_{1},x_{2},\ldots)\rightarrow(\ldots,x_{-1},x_{0},\mathbf{x_{1}},x_{2},x_{3},\ldots)$

is universal for the class of compact metric topological dynamical systems whose mean dimension is strictly less than $\textstyle \frac{d}{36}$ and which possess an infinite minimal factor.

In the same article Lindenstrauss asked what is the largest constant $\textstyle c$ such that a compact metric topological dynamical system whose mean dimension is strictly less than $\textstyle cd$ and which possesses an infinite minimal factor embeds into $\textstyle ([0,1]^{d})^{\mathbb{{Z}}}$. The results above implies $\textstyle c \geq \frac{1}{36}$. The question was answered by Lindenstrauss and Tsukamoto who showed that $\textstyle c \leq \frac{1}{2}$ and Gutman and Tsukamoto who showed that $\textstyle c \geq \frac{1}{2}$. Thus the answer is $\textstyle c=\frac{1}{2}$.

== See also ==
- Universal property
- Urysohn universal space
- Mean dimension
