= Anatole Beck =

American mathematician

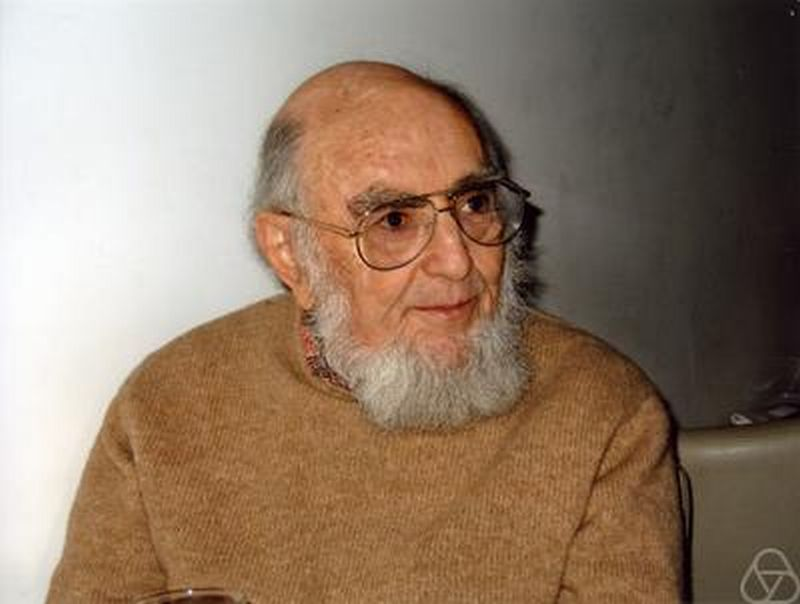
- Anatole Beck 2008
- Born: 19 March 1930; New York City, US
- Died: 21 December 2014 (aged 84); Madison, Wisconsin, US
- Education: Brooklyn College; Yale University
- Scientific career
- Fields: Mathematics
- Doctoral advisor: Shizuo Kakutani

Anatole Beck (19 March 1930 – 21 December 2014) was an American mathematician.

== Education and academic career ==
Beck graduated from Stuyvesant High School in 1947, studied at Brooklyn College (Bachelor's degree 1951) and in 1956 received his PhD from Yale University under Shizuo Kakutani. In 1958 he became Assistant Professor and in 1966 Professor in the Department of Mathematics at the University of Wisconsin–Madison. He married Jewish feminist writer Evelyn Torton Beck in 1954; they had two children before divorcing in 1974. He met his second wife Eve-Lynn Siegel Beck in 1998, she was cousins with Michael Bleicher, one of Anatole’s longtime friends.

He was a visiting professor at the Technical University of Munich, the London School of Economics and a visiting scholar at the University of Göttingen, University of Warwick, University of London, and the Hebrew University.

Beck's work dealt with ergodic theory, topological dynamics, Probability in Banach spaces, measure theory, search theory, linear search problem, and mathematics in the social sciences.

== Union leadership, political activism, and social commentator ==
Beck was an ardent supporter of unionism and cooperative economics, helping to found the faculty union chapter at the University of Wisconsin-Madison and serving as the Vice President of the Wisconsin Federation of Teachers. He spoke out strongly in favor of academic freedom on campus, and was an early supporter of the free speech rights of the movement against the Vietnam War in the 1960s. He witnessed the “Dow Riots” of October 18, 1967 in the Commerce Building (now Ingraham Hall), condemning the police violence against students at a faculty meeting. Beck made headlines in 1977 when he offered a $100 grant to a "white Quaker female student with financial need" to highlight the University of Wisconsin's policy of accepting gifts with discriminatory conditions attached. Around 1980 he and Jim Donnelly founded Wisconsin University Union (WUU) which focused on promoting shared governance and academic freedom.

Beck was interested in solving social problems. In 1996 he wrote “The Knowledge Business” advocating for investment in education, universal public preschools with adequate stimulation and nutrition. Ahead of his time, he argued for free public transportation, advocated for greater leisure, and a universal basic income from what he called the “knowledge dividend” from all past knowledge and innovation. Arguing against overtime for some and unemployment for other, he predicted that, unchecked, companies would offer little stability, longer hours and create a global economy of “exoslavery,” where the conditions of slavery could be moved to other countries. He condemned economists for calling this rational and free trade, predicting increases in underemployment, homelessness, a rise in TB, and disinvestment in basic research, among other things. He also called for a tax on security transactions, now called a Tobin tax. Beginning in 2008 he was a commentator on the Insurgent Radio Kiosk on Madison's community radio station WORT.

In 2009 Beck was interviewed extensively by Robert Lange for the UW-Madison Oral History Program.

== Headlines ==
- Michael N. Bleicher, Donald W. Crowe: Excursions into Mathematics, AK Peters, 2000 (first 1967)
- Continuous flow in the plane, Grundlehren der mathematischen Wissenschaften, Springer Verlag, 1974 (participation Mirit and Jonathan Lewin)
- with M. Bleicher: Packing convex sets into a similar set in Konrad Jacobs: Selecta Mathematica, Volume 3, Springer Verlag 1971
- A paradox. The Tortoise and the Hare, in Konrad Jacobs: Selecta Mathematica, Volume 5, Springer Verlag 1979
