= Orbit capacity =

In mathematics, the orbit capacity of a subset of a topological dynamical system may be thought of heuristically as a “topological dynamical probability measure” of the subset. More precisely, its value for a set is a tight upper bound for the normalized number of visits of orbits in this set.

== Definition ==
A topological dynamical system consists of a compact Hausdorff topological space X and a homeomorphism $T:X\rightarrow X$. Let $E\subset X$ be a set. Lindenstrauss introduced the definition of orbit capacity:

$$\operatorname{ocap}(E)=\lim_{n\rightarrow\infty}\sup_{x\in X} \frac 1 n \sum_{k=0}^{n-1} \chi_E (T^k x)$$

Here, $\chi_E(x)$ is the membership function for the set $E$. That is $\chi_E(x)=1$ if $x\in E$ and is zero otherwise.

== Properties ==
One has $0\le\operatorname{ocap}(E)\le 1$. By convention, topological dynamical systems do not come equipped with a measure; the orbit capacity can be thought of as defining one, in a "natural" way. It is not a true measure, it is only a sub-additive:

- Orbit capacity is sub-additive:

$$\operatorname{ocap}(A\cup B)\leq \operatorname{ocap}(A)+\operatorname{ocap}(B)$$

- For a closed set C,

$$\operatorname{ocap}(C)=\sup_{\mu\in \operatorname{M}_T(X)}\mu(C)$$

Where M_{T}(X) is the collection of T-invariant probability measures on X.

== Small sets ==
When $\operatorname{ocap}(A)=0$, $A$ is called small. These sets occur in the definition of the small boundary property.
