= Kakutani's theorem =

In mathematics, Kakutani's theorem may refer to:

- the Kakutani fixed-point theorem, a fixed-point theorem for set-valued functions;
- Kakutani's theorem (geometry): the result that every convex body in 3-dimensional space has a circumscribed cube;
- Kakutani's theorem (measure theory): a result on the mutual equivalence or singularity of infinite product measures
- the result that a Banach space is reflexive if and only if its closed unit ball is compact in the weak topology: see Reflexive space#Properties.
- the Birkhoff-Kakutani theorem: the result that for a topological group, metrizability, first countability, and the existence of a compatible left-invariant metric are all equivalent.
