= Tatsujiro Shimizu =

Japanese mathematician

- Born: 7 April 1897; Tokyo
- Died: 8 November 1992 (aged 95); Uji, Kyoto
- Education: Tokyo Imperial University
- Known for: Ahlfors-Shimizu characteristic, foundation of Japanese Association of Mathematical Sciences
- Scientific career
- Fields: Mathematics, Complex Analysis, Numerical Analysis
- Workplaces: Tokyo Imperial University, Osaka Imperial University, Kobe University, University of Osaka Prefecture, Tokyo University of Science
- Doctoral students: Shizuo Kakutani

Tatsujiro Shimizu (清水 辰次郎, Shimizu Tatsujirō; 7 April 1897 – 8 November 1992) was a Japanese mathematician working in the field of complex analysis. He was the founder of the Japanese Association of Mathematical Sciences.

== Life and career ==
Shimizu graduated from the Department of Mathematics, School of Science, Tokyo Imperial University in 1924, and stayed there working as a staff member. In 1932 he moved to Osaka Imperial University and became a professor. He made contributions to the establishment of the Department of Mathematics there. In 1949, Shimizu left Osaka and took up a professorship at Kobe University. After two years, he moved again to Osaka Prefectural University. From 1961 he was a professor at the Tokyo University of Science.

In 1948, seeing the difficulty in publication of paper in mathematics, Shimizu started a new journal Mathematica Japonicae, for papers of pure and applied mathematics in general, on his own funds. The journal served as the foundation of the Japanese Association of Mathematical Sciences.

Shimizu remained active in mathematics into old age. He gave talks at the meeting of the Mathematical Society of Japan until 90 years old. He died in Uji City, Kyoto Prefecture, on November 8, 1992, at the age 95.

== Works ==
=== Function theory ===
The first works of Shimizu treated topics of function theory, in particular the theory of meromorphic functions. A new form of the Nevanlinna characteristic generalised by him (and separately by Ahlfors) is now known as the Ahlfors-Shimizu characteristic. Additionally, with the idea of function groups, he attained a profound result on the construction of Riemann surface of meromorphic functions. In 1931, as a pioneer in Japan responding to Fatou's study of the theory of iteration of the algebraic functions, Shimizu published two papers introducing the subject in Japanese journals.

=== Applied mathematics ===
Since he moved to Osaka in 1932, Shimizu has been interested in the application of mathematical methods into science and technology. He broadly worked on the existence conditions of limit cycles, numerical analysis and applied analysis (including solving ordinary differential equations, numerical solutions and non-linear oscillations), computing machines and devices, as well as artificial intelligence (especially in solving arithmetic problems through electronic computer). His research in these areas was continued through this career. He was also involved in operations research and mathematics in management sciences, as well as probability theory and mathematical statistics.

== Notable students ==
Among his students is Shizuo Kakutani, Osaka University, 1941

== Books ==
- Statistical Machine Computing Method (「統計機械計算法」)
- Practical Mathematics (「実用数学」)
- Non-linear Oscillation Theory (「非線形振動論」)
- Applied Mathematics (「応用数学」)
