= Kharlamov =

Kharlamov (Russian: Харламов, female Kharlamova (Харламова)) is a Russian surname. Notable people with the surname include:

- Alexander Kharlamov, ice hockey player
- Garik Kharlamov, Russian actor, resident of Comedy Club Russia
- Nikolay Mikhaylovich Kharlamov, military leader
- Semyon Kharlamov, a Soviet aircraft pilot and Hero of the Soviet Union
- Sergei Kharlamov, a Russian footballer
- Valeri Kharlamov, ice hockey player
- Vasily Kharlamov, military leader
- Viatcheslav M. Kharlamov (born 1950), Russian-French mathematician
