= Gudkov's conjecture =

In real algebraic geometry, Gudkov's conjecture, also called Gudkov’s congruence, (named after Dmitry Gudkov) was a conjecture, and is now a theorem, which states that a M-curve of even degree $2d$ obeys the congruence

$$p - n \equiv d^2\, (\!\bmod 8),$$

where $p$ is the number of positive ovals and $n$ the number of negative ovals of the M-curve. (Here, the term M-curve stands for "maximal curve"; it means a smooth algebraic curve over the reals whose genus is $k-1$, where $k$ is the number of maximal components of the curve.)

The theorem was proved by the combined works of Vladimir Arnold and Vladimir Rokhlin.

== See also ==
- Hilbert's sixteenth problem
- Tropical geometry
