= Evelyn Torton Beck =

American academic (born 1933)

- Born: January 18, 1933 (age 93); Vienna, Austria
- Spouse(s): Anatole Beck (1954-1974); Lee Knefelkamp
- Children: 2

Academic background
- Thesis: Kafka and the Yiddish theater : a study of the impact of the Yiddish theater on the work of Franz Kafka (1969)

Academic work
- Discipline: Jewish studies; Women's studies
- Institutions: University of Maryland, College Park

Evelyn Torton Beck (born January 18, 1933) is a retired American academic. Until her retirement in 2002 she specialized in women's studies, Jewish women's studies and lesbian studies at the University of Maryland, College Park.

Beck has published a number of essays and books on Judaism. She came to wider prominence in 1982 with her book, Nice Jewish Girls: A Lesbian Anthology, a compilation of poems, essays, reminiscences and short stories, believed to be the first published collection of works by lesbian Jewish women in the United States.

== Provenance and early years ==
Evelyn Torton was born into a Jewish family in Vienna, Austria. Max Torton, her father, came originally from Buchach, a small town which at that time would have been regarded as Polish. (Since 1944 it has been in Western Ukraine.) Her mother, born Irma Lichtmann, was from Vienna. Politics in Austria became increasingly polarised during the 1930s, and around the time of Evelyn's birth the country became a one-party dictatorship. The Austrian government came increasingly under German influence. Following Austria's integration into an enlarged Germany in March 1938, antisemitism became a mainstream element of government policy: in 1938, her father was arrested and taken to the Dachau concentration camp. The rest of the family were obliged to leave their Vienna apartment and move into a ghetto. Here they lived with other families in a multi-occupancy apartment. By 1939, her father had been transferred to Buchenwald concentration camp, and then released under circumstances that never became clear. That year, six-year-old Evelyn, together with her parents and her younger brother Edgar, fled to Italy where the family settled for a couple of months in Milan. It was only possible to obtain four visas, and they had to leave Evelyn's maternal grandmother, who had always lived with the family, behind in Vienna. She would later be deported by the Nazi authorities and murdered. By the time Evelyn reached New York with her parents in June 1940, she was seven. Her father told her that theirs had been the last emigrant ship permitted to leave Italy for the United States. Her younger brother Edgar remained in Europe, but he survived the Holocaust and emigrated to New York after the war.

Evelyn grew up in Brooklyn in a working-class neighborhood. Her father, who had owned his own business in Vienna, now worked in a factory owned by a relative. Here he met up with other Yiddish speaking exiles. Evelyn's mother was not able to settle to their new life so quickly. When news came through of her own mother's murder she suffered a nervous breakdown. Meanwhile, Evelyn joined Hashomer Hatzair, a Socialist-Zionist, secular Jewish youth movement which at the time was strongly focused on preparing young people for emigration to Palestine. In an interview given in 2001 she said that the pioneering spirit and shared objectives which she experienced as a member of Hashomer Hatzair, together with the comradeship and the sense of belonging, did much to form her. She was also impressed by the way that within the movement women and men all did the same work.

== Education ==
Evelyn Torton Beck studied comparative literature and received her BA (first degree) from Brooklyn College in 1954, which was also the year of her first marriage. The next year she received her MA from Yale. Her doctorate from the University of Wisconsin–Madison would follow in 1969. Her doctoral dissertation concerned Franz Kafka and the influence of Yiddish theatre on his work.

== Academic career ==
Starting in 1972 Beck spent twelve years teaching Comparative Literature, German, and Women’s Studies at the University of Wisconsin, becoming an associate professor in 1977 and promoted to a full professorship in 1982. Her study of Kafka for her doctorate had led her to a deepening interest in Jewish literary and cultural heritage more generally. Foreshadowing later trends, in 1972 she founded a section for Yiddish in the Modern Language Association, then as now the principal professional association in the United States for scholars of language and literature. She introduced Jewish topics and writers, such as Sholem Aleichem, to her teaching program. She translated into English works by Isaac Bashevis Singer (who always wrote in Yiddish). One slightly unexpected product of her work with Singer was her essay, "The Many Faces of Eve: Women, Yiddish, and Isaac Bashevis Singer" (1982).

In the context of what was coming to be defined as second-wave feminism she was one of the first to call for "lesbian inclusion in Jewish circles and for Jewish inclusion in feminist circles". She complained that antisemitism was not taken seriously either among feminist activists or among lesbian activists. In 1982 she published "Nice Jewish Girls: A Lesbian Anthology", a compilation of poems, essays, reminiscences and short stories. A theme of the book is the painful experiences of Jewish lesbians coming up against antisemitism in society, even among lesbian feminists. At the same time the volume proudly celebrates the creative force which the contributing authors can call upon from their own Jewish witness.

In 1984, she returned to the East Coast, accepting an invitation to create and then head up the Institute for Gender studies at the University of Maryland, College Park. She also became an associate member of the Faculty for Jewish Studies and Comparative Literature. Retirement of a kind came in 2002, since when she has been Professor Emerita at the University of Maryland and an Alum Research Fellow with the Creative Longevity and Wisdom Initiative at Fielding Graduate University.

Evelyn Torton Beck collected material for a book on the theme "Wounds of Gender: Frida Kahlo and Franz Kafka" over many years. She received a second doctorate in 2004, this time in Clinical Psychology from Fielding Graduate University in California. The qualification was awarded for an interdisciplinary dissertation under the title "Physical Illness, Psychological Woundedness and the Healing Power of Art in the Life and Work of Franz Kafka and Frida Kahlo". Summarized by one commentator, "the thesis focuses on the Jewish dimension of [Kafka's and Kahlo's] work and its impact on their split sense of self". The work earned her the Frieda Fromm-Reichmann Award for schizophrenia research.

A recurring theme of her academic career has been the creation of numerous interdisciplinary courses on topics such as Women in the Arts, Mothers and Daughters, Jewish Women in International Perspective, Women and the Holocaust, Death and Dying in Modern Literature, Lesbian Studies, Gender, Power and the Spectrum of Difference, Healing Women, and Feminist Perspectives on Psychology.

== Scholarly work ==
Beck is the author of numerous books and essays focusing on Franz Kafka and Yiddish theatre (1972), Frida Kahlo and Isaac Bashevis Singer (with whom she worked closely and whose stories she translated from Yiddish). She is the editor of Nice Jewish Girls: A Lesbian Anthology (1982/1989).

She wrote on multiculturalism and the impact of sexism, anti-Semitism, and homophobia on women’s identity development. She lectured on these themes in Europe, Japan and across the United States. Interviews with her appear in English, German and Japanese journals. She was invited to discuss Freud’s legacy on The Diane Rehm Show and was heard on NPR with a critique of the epithet "Jewish American Princess" on which she wrote.

As of 2015, she was editing a collection of her essays and revising her book-length manuscript Physical Illness, Psychological Woundedness and the Healing Power of Art in the Life and Work of Franz Kafka and Frida Kahlo.

Another avenue of current research focuses on the impact of sacred circle dance on the lives of older women. After intensive training with teachers from Europe, South America, and the United States, she began teaching this dance practice regularly in the Washington, D.C., area, while running inter-arts workshops combining poetry with sacred circle dance at professional meetings.

== Personal life ==
Her first marriage, in 1954, was to mathematician Anatole Beck; the couple raised two children, Nina and Micah. The marriage ended in divorce in 1974. At age 40, she came out as a lesbian. She subsequently married Lee Knefelkamp, who is an academic in psychology and education (and a woman). Evelyn Torton Beck has been a grandmother since 2001.

== Selected awards and honours ==
- 1994: Outstanding Woman of the Year Award der University of Maryland
- 1995: Distinguished Scholar/Teacher Award der University of Maryland
- 2004: Frieda Fromm-Reichmann Dissertation Award

== Selected publications ==
=== Books ===
- Kafka and the Yiddish Theater. Its Impact on his Work, University of Wisconsin Press, 1971 (Dissertation)
- Nice Jewish Girls. A Lesbian Anthology (as compiler-editor), Persephone Press, 1982. Reprinted: Beacon Press, Boston 1984 und 1989
- Physical illness, psychological woundedness and the healing power of art in the life and work of Franz Kafka and Frida Kahlo, University of Wisconsin–Madison, 2004

=== Contributions to books ===
- "Naming is not a simple act: Jewish lesbian-feminist community in the 1980s", in: Christie Balka and Andy Rose (editors): Twice Blessed: On Being Lesbian or Gay and Jewish, Beacon Press, Boston 1991
- "On being a pre-feminist feminist OR How I came to Women’s Studies and what I did there", in: A. Ginsberg (editor-compiler): The Evolution of American Women’s Studies. Reflections on Triumphs, Controversies, and Change, Palgrave Macmillan, New York 2008, pp. 110–130
- Frida Kahlo. in: B. Zimmerman (editor-compiler): Encyclopedia of Homosexuality, second ed., vol. I: Lesbian Histories and Cultures, Garland Publishing, New York 1999
- "Why Kafka? A Jewish Lesbian Feminist Asks?" in: R.Siegel & E.Cole (editor-compiler): Patterns in Jewish Women’s Lives. A Feminist Sampler, Haworth Press, New York 1997, pp. 187–200
- "Judaism, Feminism and Psychology. Making the Links Visible", in: K.Weiner, A. Moon (Hrsg.): Jewish Women Speak Out. Expanding the Boundaries of Psychology, Canopy Press, Seattle 1995
- "The Place of Jewish Experience in a Multicultural University Curriculum", in: Marla Brettschneider (Hrsg.): The Narrow Bridge. Jewish Perspectives on Multiculturalism, Rutgers University Press 1996, pp. 163–177

=== Essays ===
- "Kahlo’s World Split Open", in: Feminist Studies, Nr. 32, 1/2006, pp. 54–83
- "The Many Faces of Eve: Women, Yiddish, and Isaac Bashevis Singer", in: Studies in American Jewish Literature No. 1/1981, pp. 112–123
- "LB. Singer’s Misogyny", in: Lilith. The Jewish Women's Magazine, Frühling 1980
