= Markov–Kakutani fixed-point theorem =

In mathematics, the Markov–Kakutani fixed-point theorem, named after Andrey Markov and Shizuo Kakutani, states that a commuting family of continuous affine self-mappings of a compact convex subset in a locally convex topological vector space has a common fixed point. This theorem is a key tool in one of the quickest proofs of amenability of abelian groups.

== Statement ==
Let $X$ be a locally convex topological vector space, with a compact convex subset $K$. Let $S$ be a family of continuous mappings of $K$ to itself which commute and are affine, meaning that $T(\lambda x + (1-\lambda)y) = \lambda T(x) + (1-\lambda)T(y)$ for all $\lambda$ in $(0,1)$ and $T$ in $S$. Then the mappings in $S$ share a fixed point.

== Proof for a single affine self-mapping ==
Let $T$ be a continuous affine self-mapping of $K$.

For $x$ in $K$ define a net $\{x(N)\}_{N\in\mathbb{N}}$ in $K$ by

$$x(N)={1\over N+1}\sum_{n=0}^N T^n(x).$$

Since $K$ is compact, there is a convergent subnet in $K$:

$$x(N_i)\rightarrow y. \,$$

To prove that $y$ is a fixed point, it suffices to show that $f(Ty) = f(y)$ for every $f$ in the dual of $X$. (The dual separates points by the Hahn-Banach theorem; this is where the assumption of local convexity is used.)

Since $K$ is compact, $|f|$ is bounded on $K$ by a positive constant $M$. On the other hand

$$|f(Tx(N))-f(x(N))|={1\over N+1} |f(T^{N+1}x)-f(x)|\le {2M\over N+1}.$$

Taking $N = N_i$ and passing to the limit as $i$ goes to infinity, it follows that

$$f(Ty) = f(y). \,$$

Hence

$$Ty = y. \,$$

== Proof of theorem ==
The set of fixed points of a single affine mapping $T$ is a non-empty compact convex set $K^T$ by the result for a single mapping. The other mappings in the family $S$ commute with $T$ so leave $K^T$ invariant. Applying the result for a single mapping successively, it follows that any finite subset of $S$ has a non-empty fixed point set given as the intersection of the compact convex sets $K^T$ as $T$ ranges over the subset. From the compactness of $K$ it follows that the set

$$K^S=\{y\in K\mid Ty=y, \, T\in S\}=\bigcap_{T\in S} K^T \,$$

is non-empty (and compact and convex).
