= Mean dimension =

In mathematics, the mean (topological) dimension of a topological dynamical system is a non-negative extended real number that is a measure of the complexity of the system. Mean dimension was first introduced in 1999 by Gromov. Shortly after it was developed and studied systematically by Lindenstrauss and Weiss. In particular they proved the following key fact: a system with finite topological entropy has zero mean dimension. For various topological dynamical systems with infinite topological entropy, the mean dimension can be calculated or at least bounded from below and above. This allows mean dimension to be used to distinguish between systems with infinite topological entropy. Mean dimension is also related to the problem of embedding topological dynamical systems in shift spaces (over Euclidean cubes).

== General definition ==
A topological dynamical system consists of a compact Hausdorff topological space $\textstyle X$ and a continuous self-map $\textstyle T:X\rightarrow X$. Let $\textstyle \mathcal{O}$ denote the collection of open finite covers of $\textstyle X$. For $\textstyle \alpha\in\mathcal{O}$ define its order by

$$\operatorname{ord}(\alpha)=\max_{x\in X}\sum_{U\in\alpha}1_U(x)-1$$

An open finite cover $\textstyle \beta$ refines $\textstyle \alpha$, denoted $\textstyle \beta\succ\alpha$, if for every $\textstyle V\in\beta$, there is $\textstyle U\in\alpha$ so that $\textstyle V\subset U$. Let

$$D(\alpha)=\min_{\beta\succ\alpha} \operatorname{ord}(\beta)$$

Note that in terms of this definition the Lebesgue covering dimension is defined by $\dim_\mathrm{Leb}(X)=\sup_{\alpha\in\mathcal{O}}D(\alpha)$.

Let $\textstyle \alpha,\beta$ be open finite covers of $\textstyle X$. The join of $\textstyle \alpha$ and $\textstyle \beta$ is the open finite cover by all sets of the form $\textstyle A\cap B$ where $\textstyle A\in\alpha$, $\textstyle B\in\beta$. Similarly one can define the join $\textstyle \bigvee_{i=1}^n\alpha_i$ of any finite collection of open covers of $\textstyle X$.

The mean dimension is the non-negative extended real number:

$$\operatorname{mdim}(X,T)=\sup_{\alpha\in\mathcal{\mathcal{O}}}\lim_{n\rightarrow\infty}\frac{D(\alpha^n)}{n}$$

where $\textstyle \alpha^n=\bigvee_{i=0}^{n-1}T^{-i}\alpha.$

== Definition in the metric case ==
If the compact Hausdorff topological space $\textstyle X$ is metrizable and $\textstyle d$ is a compatible metric, an equivalent definition can be given. For $\textstyle \varepsilon>0$, let $\textstyle\operatorname{Widim}_\varepsilon(X,d)$ be the minimal non-negative integer $\textstyle n$, such that there exists an open finite cover of $\textstyle X$ by sets of diameter less than $\textstyle \varepsilon$ such that any $\textstyle n+2$ distinct sets from this cover have empty intersection. Note that in terms of this definition the Lebesgue covering dimension is defined by $\textstyle \dim_\mathrm{Leb}(X)=\sup_{\varepsilon>0} \operatorname{Widim}_\varepsilon(X,d)$. Let

$$d_n(x,y)=\max_{0\leq i\leq n-1}d(T^i x,T^i y)$$

The mean dimension is the non-negative extended real number:

$$\operatorname{mdim}(X,d)=\sup_{\varepsilon>0}\lim_{n\rightarrow\infty}\frac{\operatorname{Widim}_\varepsilon(X,d_n)}{n}$$

== Properties ==
- Mean dimension is an invariant of topological dynamical systems taking values in $\textstyle [0,\infty]$.
- If the Lebesgue covering dimension of the system is finite then its mean dimension vanishes, i.e. $\textstyle \dim_\mathrm{Leb}(X)<\infty\Rightarrow \operatorname{mdim}(X,T)=0$.
- If the topological entropy of the system is finite then its mean dimension vanishes, i.e. $\textstyle \dim_\mathrm{top}(X,T)<\infty\Rightarrow \operatorname{mdim}(X,T)=0$.

== Example ==
Let $\textstyle d\in\mathbb{{N}}$. Let $\textstyle X=([0,1]^d)^{\mathbb{Z}}$ and $\textstyle T:X\rightarrow X$ be the shift homeomorphism $\textstyle (\ldots,x_{-2},x_{-1},\mathbf{x_0},x_1,x_2,\ldots)\rightarrow(\ldots,x_{-1},x_0,\mathbf{x_1},x_2,x_3,\ldots)$, then $\textstyle \operatorname{mdim}(X,T)=d$.

== See also ==
- Dimension theory
- Topological entropy
- Universal spaces (in topology and topological dynamics)
