= Doug Lind =

American mathematician

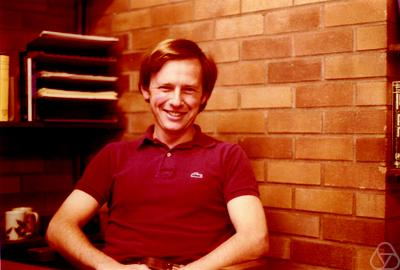
- Lind in Seattle in 1978
- Education: Stanford University
- Scientific career
- Fields: Mathematics
- Workplaces: University of Washington
- Thesis: Locally Compact Measure Preserving Flows (1973)
- Doctoral advisor: Donald Samuel Ornstein
- Website: faculty.washington.edu/lind/

Doug Lind is an American mathematician specializing in ergodic theory and dynamical systems. He is a professor emeritus at the University of Washington. Lind was named as one of the inaugural fellows of the American Mathematical Society in 2013. He is a board member of Spectra, an association for LGBT mathematicians.

== Education ==
Lind received his PhD from Stanford University in 1973. His advisor was Donald Samuel Ornstein and the title of his dissertation was Locally Compact Measure Preserving Flows.

== See also ==
- Daniel Rudolph - contemporary of Doug Lind
