= Nikolai Ivanov (mathematician) =

Russian mathematician (born 1954)

Nikolai V. Ivanov
- Born: 1954 (age 71–72)
- Education: Steklov Mathematical Institute
- Known for: Contributions to Teichmüller theory
- Scientific career
- Fields: Mathematics
- Workplaces: Michigan State University
- Doctoral advisor: Vladimir Abramovich Rokhlin

Nikolai V. Ivanov (Russian: Николай Владимирович Иванов; born 1954) is a Russian mathematician who works on topology, geometry and group theory (particularly, modular Teichmüller groups). He is a professor at Michigan State University.

He obtained his Ph.D. under the guidance of Vladimir Abramovich Rokhlin in 1980 at the Steklov Mathematical Institute.

Among his contributions to mathematics are his classification of subgroups of surface mapping class groups, and the establishment that surface mapping class groups satisfy the Tits alternative.

He is a fellow of the American Mathematical Society since 2012.

He is the author of the 1992 book Subgroups of Teichmüller Modular Groups.

== Selected publications ==
- "Automorphisms of complexes of curves and of Teichmuller spaces" (1997), International Mathematics Research Notices 14, pp. 651–666.
- with John D. McCarthy: "On injective homomorphisms between Teichmüller modular groups I" (1999), Inventiones mathematicae 135 (2), pp. 425–486.
- "On the homology stability for Teichmüller modular groups: closed surfaces and twisted coefficients" (1993), Contemporary Mathematics 150, pp. 149–149.
