= Ami Radunskaya =

American mathematician and musician

Ami Elizabeth Radunskaya
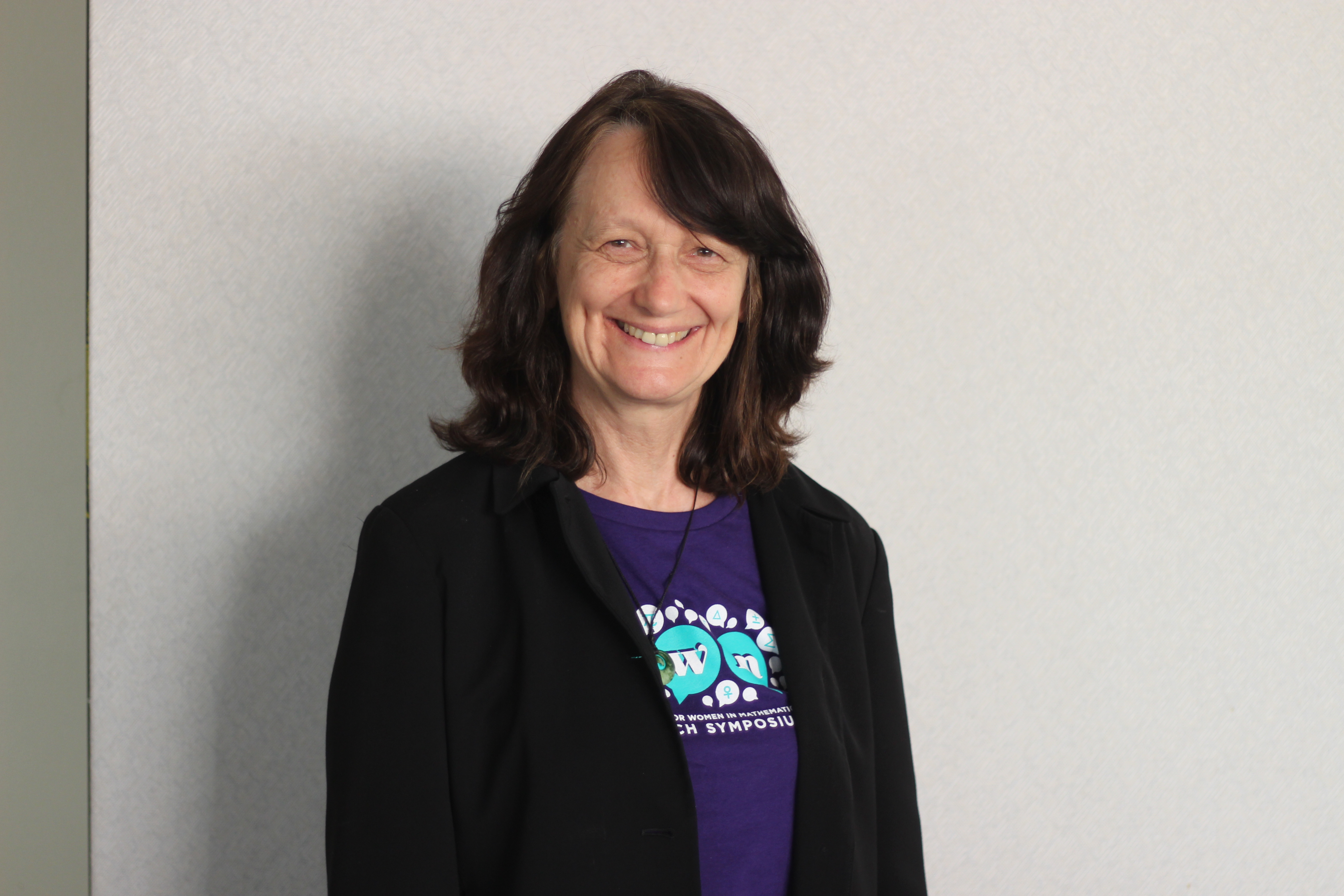
- Ami Radunskaya at AWM Research Symposium, 2017
- Education: Stanford University, 1992
- Known for: Dynamical systems, Applications of mathematics to medicine
- Scientific career
- Workplaces: Pomona College
- Doctoral advisor: Donald Samuel Ornstein

Ami Elizabeth Radunskaya is an American mathematician and musician. She is a professor of mathematics at Pomona College, where she specializes in dynamical systems and the applications of mathematics to medicine, such as the use of cellular automata to model drug delivery. In 2016 she was elected as the president of the Association for Women in Mathematics (AWM).

== Early life and music ==
Radunskaya, the daughter of a UC Berkeley economist, began playing the cello as a 9-year-old. After graduating from high school at the age of 16, she took ten years off from her education to work as cellist and music composer, including seven years as a member of the Oakland Symphony. As "a well known Bay Area cellist specializing in new music", she "performed throughout the U.S. and Europe with Don Buchla." In the late 1970s, Buchla Electronic Musical Instruments made a custom synthesizer for her, the "Sili-Con Cello", and several of her works use the radio baton, a controller for electronic music devices in the form of a conductor's baton. One of her cello and radio baton compositions, "A Wild and Reckless Place" (1990), is known for its use of the Bohlen–Pierce scale.

== Education ==
Radunskaya did her undergraduate studies at the University of California, Berkeley, as a single mother. There, she studied computer science and chemistry before eventually majoring in mathematics. She completed her doctorate in mathematics at Stanford University in 1992, under the supervision of Donald Samuel Ornstein; her dissertation was titled Statistical Properties of Deterministic Bernoulli Flows.

== Mathematics career ==
After postdoctoral studies at Rice University, she joined the Pomona College faculty in 1994. In June 2022, the college announced her appointment as the Lingurn H. Burkhead Professor of Mathematics, an endowed chair.

== Awards and honors ==
Radunskaya was the AWM/MAA Falconer Lecturer for 2010, speaking on "Mathematical Challenges in the Treatment of Cancer". In 2016 she was named as a Fellow of the American Mathematical Society "for contributions to mathematical oncology, immuno-dynamics, and applications of dynamical systems to medicine, and for service to the mathematical community." She also won the Mentor Award of the American Association for the Advancement of Science for her work as a founder and director of the EDGE Foundation, a national program that encourages women to study mathematics at the graduate level. Radunskaya was president of the Association for Women in Mathematics (AWM) from February 2017 to January 2019. She was selected as a Fellow of the Association for Women in Mathematics in the Class of 2021 "for her career-long efforts to invite women into our profession by learning about people’s individual journeys and driving the community to be more welcoming of diverse pathways into mathematics via her work during her AWM presidency and as co-director of the Enhancing Diversity in Graduate Education summer program." Radunskaya gave the opening plenary lecture at the 2022 AWM Research Symposium. She also received the Alfred Gores Award for Excellence in Teaching in 1991. She won the Wig Distinguished Professor Award In May 2024, at Pomona College.
