= Dmitry Gudkov (mathematician) =

Russian mathematician

Dmitrii Andreevich Gudkov (Russian: Дмитрий Андреевич Гудков, also spelled Dmitry;1918–1992) was a Soviet mathematician famous for his work on Hilbert's sixteenth problem and the related Gudkov's conjecture in algebraic geometry. He was a student of Aleksandr Andronov.

== Selected papers ==
- D. A. Gudkov, "The topology of real projective algebraic varieties", Russian Mathematical Surveys, 1974, 29 (4), pp. 1–79 (translated from the Russian original).
- D. A. Gudkov "Periodicity of the Euler characteristic of real algebraic (M—1)-manifolds", Functional Analysis and Its Applications, April–June, 1973, Volume 7, Issue 2, pp. 98–102 (translated from the Russian original).
- D.A Gudkov. "Ovals of sixth order curves". in the book Nine Papers on Hilbert's 16th Problem American Mathematical Society 112, pp. 9–14 (translated from the Russian original).
