= Shizuo Kakutani =

Japanese and American mathematician

- 角谷 静夫
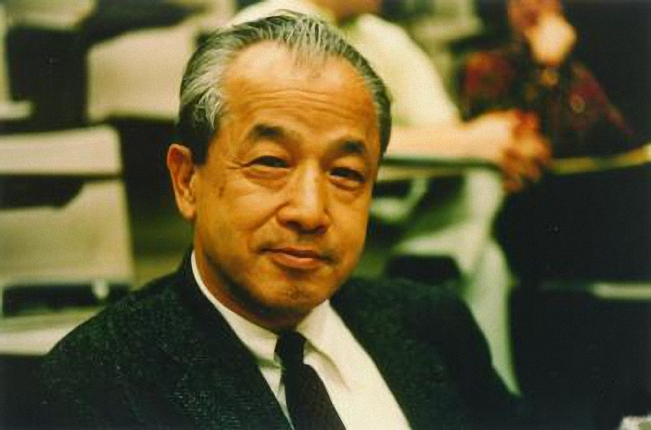
- Kakutani in 1970
- Born: August 28, 1911; Osaka, Japan
- Died: August 17, 2004 (aged 92); New Haven, Connecticut, U.S.
- Education: Osaka University
- Known for: Kakutani fixed-point theorem Markov–Kakutani fixed-point theorem Kakutani's theorem (geometry); Kakutani–Rokhlin lemma Riesz–Markov–Kakutani representation theorem
- Spouse: Keiko ("Kay") Uchida
- Children: Michiko Kakutani
- Scientific career
- Fields: Mathematics
- Workplaces: Yale University
- Doctoral advisor: Tatsujiro Shimizu
- Doctoral students: Roy Adler; Robert M. Anderson; Anatole Beck; Alexandra Bellow

Shizuo Kakutani (角谷 静夫, Kakutani Shizuo; August 28, 1911 – August 17, 2004) was a Japanese and American mathematician, best known for his eponymous fixed-point theorem.

== Biography ==
Kakutani attended Tohoku University in Sendai, where his advisor was Tatsujiro Shimizu. At one point he spent two years at the Institute for Advanced Study in Princeton at the invitation of the mathematician Hermann Weyl. While there, he also met John von Neumann.

Kakutani received his Ph.D. in 1941 from Osaka University and taught there through World War II. He returned to the Institute for Advanced Study in 1948, and was given a professorship by Yale in 1949, where he won a students' choice award for excellence in teaching.

Kakutani received two awards of the Japan Academy, the Imperial Prize and the Academy Prize in 1982, for his scholarly achievements in general and his work on functional analysis in particular. He was a Plenary Speaker of the ICM in 1950 in Cambridge, Massachusetts.

Kakutani was married to Keiko ("Kay") Uchida, who was a sister to author Yoshiko Uchida. His daughter, Michiko Kakutani, is a Pulitzer Prize-winning former literary critic for The New York Times.

== Work ==
The Kakutani fixed-point theorem is a generalization of Brouwer's fixed-point theorem, holding for generalized correspondences instead of functions. Its most important uses are in proving the existence of Nash equilibria in game theory, and the Arrow–Debreu–McKenzie model of general equilibrium theory in microeconomics.

Kakutani's other mathematical contributions include Markov–Kakutani fixed-point theorem, another fixed point theorem; the Kakutani skyscraper, a concept in ergodic theory (a branch of mathematics that studies dynamical systems with an invariant measure and related problems); his solution of the Poisson equation using the methods of stochastic analysis.

The Collatz conjecture is also known as the Kakutani conjecture.

== Selected articles ==
- "A generalization of Brouwer's fixed point theorem." Duke Mathematical Journal (1941): 457–459. doi:10.1215/S0012-7094-41-00838-4
- "Concrete representation of abstract (L)-spaces and the mean ergodic theorem." Annals of Mathematics (1941): 523–537. doi:10.2307/1968915
- "Concrete representation of abstract (M)-spaces (A characterization of the space of continuous functions)." Annals of Mathematics (1941): 994–1024. doi:10.2307/1968778
- "On equivalence of infinite product measures." Annals of Mathematics (1948): 214–224. doi:10.2307/1969123

== List of books available in English ==
- Selected papers / Shizuo Kakutani; Robert R. Kallman, editor (1986)
