= Vladimir Abramovich Rokhlin =

Soviet mathematician (1919–1984)

Vladimir Rokhlin
- Владимир Рохлин
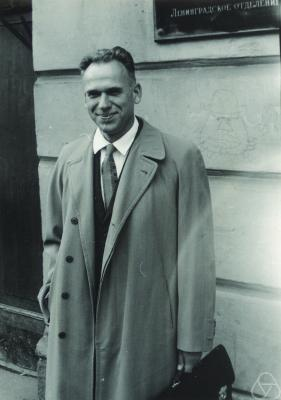
- Rokhlin in 1966 Leningrad
- Born: 23 August 1919; Baku, Azerbaijan
- Died: 3 December 1984 (aged 65); Leningrad, Soviet Union
- Citizenship: Soviet Union
- Education: Moscow State University (1935–1941)
- Known for: Rokhlin lemma; Rokhlin partitions; Rokhlin's theorem; Standard probability space; Gudkov's conjecture
- Children: Vladimir Rokhlin, Jr.
- Scientific career
- Fields: Mathematics
- Workplaces: Leningrad State University
- Academic advisors: Abraham Plessner
- Notable students: Yakov Eliashberg; Mikhail Gromov; Nikolai V. Ivanov; Viatcheslav M. Kharlamov; Anatoly Vershik; Oleg Viro

Vladimir Abramovich Rokhlin (Russian: Владимир Абрамович Рохлин; 23 August 1919 – 3 December 1984) was a Soviet mathematician, who made numerous contributions in algebraic topology, geometry, measure theory, probability theory, ergodic theory and entropy theory.

== Life ==
Vladimir Abramovich Rokhlin was born in Baku, Azerbaijan, to a wealthy Jewish family. His mother, Henrietta Emmanuilovna Levenson, had studied medicine in France (she died in Baku in 1923, believed to have been killed during civil unrest provoked by an epidemic). His maternal grandmother, Clara Levenson, had been one of the first female doctors in Russia. His maternal grandfather Emmanuil Levenson was a wealthy businessman (he was also the illegitimate father of Korney Chukovsky, who was thus Henrietta's half-brother). Vladimir Rokhlin's father Abram Veniaminovich Rokhlin was a well-known social democrat (he was imprisoned during Stalin's Great Purge, and executed in 1941).

Vladimir Rokhlin entered Moscow State University in 1935. His advisor was Abraham Plessner. In 1940, he graduated from the MSU Faculty of Mechanics and Mathematics.He volunteered for the army in 1941, leading to four years as a prisoner of a German war camp. During this time he was able to hide his Jewish origins from the Nazis. Rokhlin was liberated by the Soviet military in January 1945. He then served as a German language translator for the 5th Army of the Belorussian front. In May 1945 he was sent to a Soviet 'verification camp' for former prisoners of war. In January 1946 he was transferred to another camp to determine if he was an "enemy of the Soviet." Rokhlin was cleared in June 1946 but was forced to remain in the camp as a guard. Due to intercession by mathematicians Andrey Kolmogorov and Lev Pontryagin, he was released in December 1946 and allowed to return to Moscow, after which he returned to mathematics. At Pontryagin's suggestion, he joined Steklov Institute of Mathematics as Pontryagin's official research assistant.

In the 1950s, during the anti-cosmopolitan campaign, he was forced to resign from Steklov Institute of Mathematics and leave the capital. In 1952-1955 he worked in higher education institutions of Arkhangelsk. In 1955 Rokhlin and his family managed to move closer to Moscow, to academic institutes. Since September 1955 he has been a professor of the Department of Mathematical Analysis at the Ivanovo State University, since 1957 he has been a professor of the Department of Mathematics at the Kolomna Pedagogical Institute.

In 1959 Rokhlin joined Leningrad State University as a faculty member. He died in 1984 in Leningrad. His students include Viatcheslav Kharlamov, Yakov Eliashberg, Mikhail Gromov, Nikolai V. Ivanov, Anatoly Vershik and Oleg Viro.

== Work ==
Rokhlin's contributions to topology include Rokhlin's theorem, a result of 1952 on the signature of 4-manifolds. He also worked in the theory of characteristic classes, homotopy theory, cobordism theory, and in the topology of real algebraic varieties.

In measure theory, Rokhlin introduced what are now called Rokhlin partitions. He introduced the notion of standard probability space, and characterised such spaces up to isomorphism mod 0. He also proved the famous Rokhlin lemma.

== Family ==
His son Vladimir Rokhlin, Jr. is a well-known mathematician and computer scientist at Yale University.

Rokhlin's uncle was Korney Chukovsky, a well-known Russian poet, most famous for his popular children's books.

== See also ==
- Gudkov's conjecture
