= Daniel Rudolph =

American mathematician

Daniel Jay Rudolph
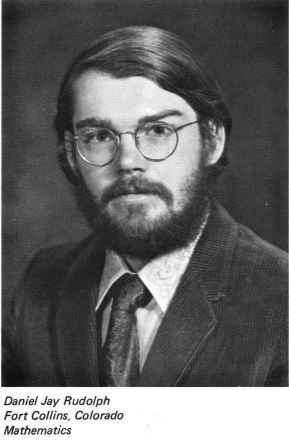
- Daniel J Rudolph in 1972
- Born: October 3, 1949; Sheridan, Wyoming, US
- Died: February 4, 2010 (aged 60); Fort Collins, Colorado, US
- Education: Caltech; Stanford University
- Known for: Ergodic theory
- Spouse: Michelle Hyde
- Children: 3
- Scientific career
- Workplaces: Hebrew University of Jerusalem; Miller Institute at U.C. Berkeley; University of Maryland; Colorado State University
- Thesis: Non-Bernoulli Behavior of the Roots of K-automorphisms (1975)
- Doctoral advisor: Donald Samuel Ornstein
- Notable students: Ayşe Şahin
- Website: Former website

Daniel Jay Rudolph (1949–2010) was a mathematician who was a leader in ergodic theory and dynamical systems.

== Early life and education ==
Rudolph moved to Fort Collins when he was very young. He attended Fort Collins High School where he was a semifinalist in the Westinghouse Science Talent Search. He graduated from Fort Collins High School in 1968 and graduated from Caltech with a bachelor's degree in mathematics in 1972.

Rudolph completed his PhD under the supervision of Don Ornstein in 1975, with the thesis "Non-Bernoulli Behavior of the Roots of K-automorphisms".

== Career ==
After his Ph.D. Rudolph was a postdoctoral fellow at the Hebrew University of Jerusalem and was a fellow of the Miller Institute at U.C. Berkeley. He then taught at Stanford, the University of Maryland and Colrado State University.

In collaboration with Janet Kammeyer and others, Rudolph developed a theory of restricted orbit equivalence which unified Ornstein’s Bernoulli theory, Dye’s theorem, Kakutani equivalence, and other relations into a single framework.

Rudolph received many honors including receiving a Sloan Research Fellowship. He gave an invited lecture at the 2002 International Congress of Mathematicians in Beijing. Rudolph founded and directed the SPIRAL program at Maryland, an intensive six-week preparation for graduate studies in mathematical sciences. This program was acknowledged by the American Mathematical Society with an award for "Mathematics Programs That Make a Difference" in 2008.

Rudolph was diagnosed with ALS and died February 4, 2010. The April 2012 volume of the journal Ergodic Theory and Dynamical Systems was dedicated to him.

== Selected publications ==
Rudolph authored and co-authored more than 70 articles in ergodic theory, including:

- Rudolph, Daniel J. (1976). "Two nonisomorphic K-automorphisms with isomorphic squares". Israel Journal of Mathematics. 23 (3–4). Springer Science and Business Media LLC: 274–287. doi:10.1007/bf02761805. ISSN 0021-2172. S2CID 123527803.
- Rudolph, Daniel J.; Schwarz, Gideon (1976). "On attaining $\bar{d}$". Israel Journal of Mathematics. 24 (3–4). Springer Science and Business Media LLC: 185–190. doi:10.1007/bf02834748. ISSN 0021-2172. S2CID 123823726.
- Rudolph, Daniel J.; Schmidt, Klaus (1995). "Almost block independence and bernoullicity of d-actions by automorphisms of compact abelian groups". Inventiones Mathematicae. 120 (1). Springer Science and Business Media LLC: 455–488. Bibcode:1995InMat.120..455R. doi:10.1007/bf01241139. ISSN 0020-9910. S2CID 17353044.
- Rudolph, Daniel J. (December 17, 1997). "Fully generic sequences and a multiple-term return-times theorem". Inventiones Mathematicae. 131 (1). Springer Science and Business Media LLC: 199–228. Bibcode:1997InMat.131..199R. doi:10.1007/s002220050202. ISSN 0020-9910. S2CID 119779011.
- Roychowdhury, Mrinal Kanti; Rudolph, Daniel J. (2009). "Any two irreducible Markov chains are finitarily orbit equivalent". Israel Journal of Mathematics. 174 (1). Springer Science and Business Media LLC: 349–368. doi:10.1007/s11856-009-0117-7. ISSN 0021-2172. S2CID 16624772.

He also authored two books:

- Rudolph, D.J. (1990). Fundamentals of measurable dynamics: ergodic theory on Lebesgue spaces. Oxford science publications. Clarendon Press. ISBN 978-0-19-853572-0.
- Kammeyer, J.W.; Rudolph, D.J. (2002). Restricted Orbit Equivalence for Actions of Discrete Amenable Groups. Cambridge Tracts in Mathematics. Cambridge University Press. ISBN 978-0-521-80795-1.
