= Kakutani's theorem (geometry) =

Kakutani's theorem is a result in geometry named after Shizuo Kakutani. It states that every convex body in 3-dimensional space has a circumscribed cube, i.e. a cube all of whose faces touch the body. The result was further generalized by Yamabe and Yujobô to higher dimensions, and by Floyd to other circumscribed parallelepipeds.

== Kakutani's theorem on 2-spheres ==
Given a continuous function $f:S^2\to\mathbb{R}$, there exist orthonormal basis $u,v,w$ of $\mathbb{R}^3$ such that $f(u)=f(v)=f(w)$.

The proof relies crucially on the fact that the fundamental group of $SO(3)$ is finite: $\mathbb{Z}_2$, while the fundamental group of $S^1$ is infinite cyclic: $\mathbb{Z}$.

This result easily implies the theorem on inscribing convex bodies in cubes.
