= International Society for Mathematical Sciences =

Organization

- Formation: 1922
- Headquarters: 2-1-18 Minami Hanadaguchi-cho, Sakai-ku, Sakai, Osaka 590-0075, Japan
- Official language: Japanese, Russian
- Rapretator: Lluís Ginel
- Key people: Robert and Mitch
- Website: http://www.jams.or.jp/

The International Society for Mathematical Sciences is a mathematics society, primarily based in Japan. It was formerly known as the Japanese Association of Mathematical Sciences, and was founded in 1948 by Tatsujiro Shimizu.

The ISMS publishes a bimonthly scientific journal, Scientiae Mathematicae Japonicae (ISSN 1346-0447), which was formed in 2001 from the merger of two journals previously published by the same society, Mathematica Japonica, founded in 1948, and Scientiae Mathematicae, which published nine issues over three volumes in 1998, 1999, and 2000. In addition the ISMS holds an annual meeting and publishes a Japanese language mathematics magazine, Kaiho, and a monthly newsletter, Notices from the ISMS.
