= Viatcheslav M. Kharlamov =

Russian-French mathematician

Viatcheslav Mikhailovich Kharlamov (Вячеслав Михайлович Харламов, born 28 January 1950, Leningrad) is a Russian-French mathematician specializing in algebraic geometry and differential topology.

Kharlamov studied from 1967 to 1972 at the Leningrad State University, where he received his Russian candidate degree (Ph.D.) in 1975 under Vladimir Abramovich Rokhlin, with the thesis Inequalities and congruences for Euler characteristics of certain real algebraic varieties. From 1968, he taught at the Specialized Physics-Mathematics Boarding School No. 45 associated with Leningrad University (concurrently with his studies and research at the university) and from 1976, he was a professor at Syktyvkar State University. From 1979 to 1991 he was a professor at the Leningrad Electrotechnical Institute. In 1985 he received his Russian D.Sc. (habilitation) degree with the thesis Nonsingular surfaces of degree four in the real three-dimensional projective space. He has been a professor at the University of Strasbourg since 1991, where he is a permanent member of the team at the Institut de Recherche Mathématique Avancée, UMRI 7501, CNRS.

From 1972 he succeeded in solving a part of Hilbert's sixteenth problem concerning the number of components and the topology of non-singular fourth-order algebraic surfaces in three dimensions. In 1976, he completed his research on this.

In 1977 he was awarded the prize of the Moscow Mathematical Society. In 1978 he was an Invited Speaker of the ICM in Helsinki.

He has French citizenship. His doctoral students include Jean-Yves Welschinger and Thomas Fiedler.

== Selected publications ==
- with Alexander Degtyarev and Ilya Itenberg: Real Enriques Surfaces, Springer Verlag, 2000
- Variétés de Fano réelles, d'après C. Viterbo , Bourbaki Séminaire 872, 1999/2000
- with S. Yu. Orevkov and E. I. Shustin: "Singularity which has no M-smoothing" in The Arnoldfest: Proceedings of a Conference in Honour of V.I. Arnold for his Sixtieth Birthday. Vol. 24. American Mathematical Soc., 1999.
- with O. Ya. Viro, O. A. Ivanov, and N. Yu. Netsvetaev: Elementary Topology: Problem Textbook, American Mathematical Society, 2008 ISBN 978-0-8218-4506-6
- as editor with A. Korchagin, G. Polotovskii, and O. Viro: Topology of Real Algebraic Varieties and Related Topics, American Mathematical Society, 1996
