= Donald Samuel Ornstein =

American mathematician

Donald Ornstein
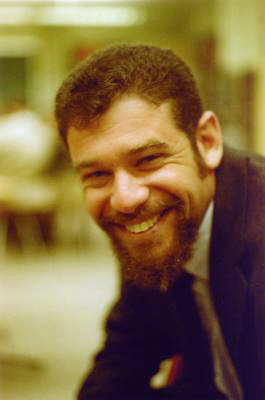
- Born: July 30, 1934 (age 92)
- Education: University of Chicago
- Awards: Bôcher Prize (1974)
- Scientific career
- Fields: Mathematics
- Institutions: Stanford University
- Doctoral advisor: Irving Kaplansky
- Doctoral students: David H. Bailey; Doug Lind; Ami Radunskaya; Daniel Rudolph

Donald Samuel Ornstein (born July 30, 1934, New York) is an American mathematician working in the area of ergodic theory. He received a Ph.D. from the University of Chicago in 1957 under the guidance of Irving Kaplansky. During his career at Stanford University he supervised the Ph. D. thesis of twenty three students, including David H. Bailey, Bob Burton, Doug Lind, Ami Radunskaya, Dan Rudolph, and Jeff Steif.

He is most famous for his work on the isomorphism of Bernoulli shifts, for which he won the 1974 Bôcher Prize. He has been a member of the National Academy of Sciences since 1981. In 2012 he became a fellow of the American Mathematical Society.
