= Benjamin Weiss =

Israeli mathematician (born 1941)

- בנימין ווייס
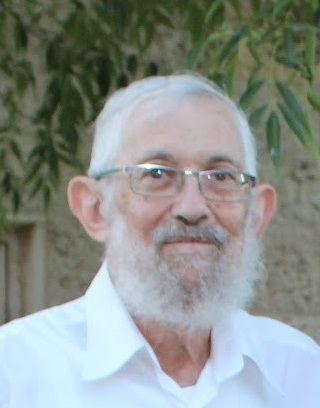
- Born: 1941 (age 84–85); New York City, US
- Education: Yeshiva University, Princeton University
- Known for: Ergodic theory, Topological dynamics, Probability theory, Game theory, Descriptive set theory, Sofic groups
- Awards: Rothschild Prize in Mathematics, Fellow of the American Mathematical Society, Foreign Honorary Member of the American Academy of Arts and Sciences. Israel Prize (2026)
- Scientific career
- Fields: Mathematics
- Workplaces: Hebrew University of Jerusalem
- Thesis: (1965)
- Doctoral advisor: William Feller
- Notable students: Itai Benjamini, Elon Lindenstrauss

Benjamin Weiss (Hebrew: בנימין ווייס; born 1941) is an American-Israeli mathematician known for his contributions to ergodic theory, topological dynamics, probability theory, game theory, and descriptive set theory. In 2026, he received the Israel Prize for mathematics and computer science research.

== Biography ==
Benjamin ("Benjy") Weiss was born in New York City. In 1962 he received B.A. from Yeshiva University and M.A. from the Graduate School of Science, Yeshiva University. In 1965, he received his Ph.D. from Princeton under the supervision of William Feller.

== Academic career ==
Between 1965 and 1967, Weiss worked at the IBM Research. In 1967, he joined the faculty of the Hebrew University of Jerusalem; and since 1990 occupied the Miriam and Julius Vinik Chair in Mathematics (Emeritus since 2009). Weiss held visiting positions at Stanford, MSRI, and IBM Research Center.

Weiss published over 180 papers in ergodic theory, topological dynamics, orbit equivalence, probability, information theory, game theory, descriptive set theory; with notable contributions including introduction of Markov partitions (with Roy Adler), development of ergodic theory of amenable groups (with Don Ornstein), mean dimension (with Elon Lindenstrauss), introduction of sofic subshifts and sofic groups. The road coloring conjecture was also posed by Weiss with Roy Adler.

One of Weiss's students is Elon Lindenstrauss, a 2010 recipient of the Fields Medal.

== Awards and recognition ==
Weiss gave an invited address at the International Congress of Mathematicians 1974, was twice the main speaker at a Conference Board of Mathematical Sciences (1979 and 1995), gave the M.B.Porter Distinguished Lecture Series at Rice University (1998). In 2000 Weiss was elected as a Foreign Honorary Member of the American Academy of Arts and Sciences. In 2006 he was awarded the Rothschild Prize in Mathematics. In 2012 Weiss was elected a Fellow of the American Mathematical Society. In 2026 Weiss received the Israel Prize in Mathematics, Computer Science and Computer Engineering.
