= Philippe Michel (number theorist) =

French mathematician (born 1969)

Philippe G. Michel
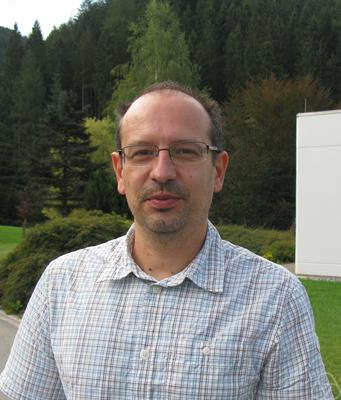
- Michel in 2011
- Born: 23 January 1969 (age 57); Lyon, France
- Scientific career
- Fields: Mathematics

Philippe Gabriel Michel (born 23 January 1969) is a French mathematician who holds the chair in analytic number theory at the École Polytechnique Fédérale de Lausanne in Switzerland.

== Early life, education and career ==
Michel was born in Lyon. He studied from 1989 to 1993 at the École normale supérieure de Cachan, and then moved to the University of Paris-Sud, where he earned a doctorate in 1995 under the supervision of Étienne Fouvry and then a habilitation in 1998. He was a professor at the University of Montpellier from 1998 to 2008, when he moved to EPFL.

== Recognition ==
In 1999, Michel was awarded the Peccot-Vimont Prize and gave the Peccot Lecture at the Collège de France. In 2006, he was an invited speaker at the International Congress of Mathematicians. In 2011, he was elected to the Academia Europaea. In 2012, he became one of the inaugural fellows of the American Mathematical Society.
