= Israel Journal of Mathematics =

- Discipline: Mathematics
- Language: English
- Edited by: Michael Temkin

Publication details
- History: 1963–present
- Publisher: Hebrew University of Jerusalem (Magnes Press)
- Frequency: Bimonthly
- Impact factor: 0.754 (2009)

Standard abbreviations
- ISO 4: Isr. J. Math.
- MathSciNet: Israel J. Math.

Indexing
- CODEN: ISJMAP
- ISSN: 0021-2172 (print); 1565-8511 (web)
- LCCN: he66000462
- OCLC no.: 01644326

Links
- Journal homepage; Online access

Israel Journal of Mathematics is a peer-reviewed mathematics journal published by the Hebrew University of Jerusalem (Magnes Press).

== History ==
Founded in 1963, as a continuation of the Bulletin of the Research Council of Israel (Section F), the journal publishes articles on all areas of mathematics. The journal is indexed by Mathematical Reviews and Zentralblatt MATH. Its 2009 MCQ was 0.70, and its 2009 impact factor was 0.754.
