= Topological dynamics =

Field of mathematics

In mathematics, topological dynamics is a branch of the theory of dynamical systems in which qualitative, asymptotic properties of dynamical systems are studied from the viewpoint of general topology.

== Scope ==
The central object of study in topological dynamics is a topological dynamical system, i.e. a topological space, together with a continuous transformation, a continuous flow, or more generally, a semigroup of continuous transformations of that space. The origins of topological dynamics lie in the study of asymptotic properties of trajectories of systems of autonomous ordinary differential equations, in particular, the behavior of limit sets and various manifestations of "repetitiveness" of the motion, such as periodic trajectories, recurrence and minimality, stability, non-wandering points. George Birkhoff is considered to be the founder of the field. A structure theorem for minimal distal flows proved by Hillel Furstenberg in the early 1960s inspired much work on classification of minimal flows. A lot of research in the 1970s and 1980s was devoted to topological dynamics of one-dimensional maps, in particular, piecewise linear self-maps of the interval and the circle.

Unlike the theory of smooth dynamical systems, where the main object of study is a smooth manifold with a diffeomorphism or a smooth flow, phase spaces considered in topological dynamics are general metric spaces (usually, compact). This necessitates development of entirely different techniques but allows an extra degree of flexibility even in the smooth setting, because invariant subsets of a manifold are frequently very complicated topologically (cf limit cycle, strange attractor); additionally, shift spaces arising via symbolic representations can be considered on an equal footing with more geometric actions. Topological dynamics has intimate connections with ergodic theory of dynamical systems, and many fundamental concepts of the latter have topological analogues (cf Kolmogorov–Sinai entropy and topological entropy).

== See also ==
- Poincaré–Bendixson theorem
- Symbolic dynamics
- Topological conjugacy
