= Zygmunt =

Name list

Zygmunt, Zigmunt, Zigmund and spelling variations thereof are masculine given names and occasionally surnames. It has the same etymology as the Germanic name Sigismund. People so named include:

== Given name ==
=== Medieval period ===
- Sigismund I the Old (1467–1548), Zygmunt I Stary in Polish, King of Poland and Grand Duke of Lithuania
- Sigismund II Augustus (1520–1572), Zygmunt II August in Polish, King of Poland and Grand Duke of Lithuania, only son of Sigismund I
- Sigismund III Vasa (1566–1632), Zygmunt III Waza in Polish, King of Poland, Grand Duke of Lithuania, monarch of the united Polish–Lithuanian Commonwealth and King of Sweden
- Zygmunt Grudziński (1560–1618), Polish nobleman, voivode (ruler) of Rawa
- Zygmunt Grudziński (1568–1653), Polish nobleman, voivode of Innowrocław and Kalisz
- Zygmunt Przyjemski of Rawicz (died 1652), Polish military commander
- Zygmunt Kazanowski (1563–1634), Polish nobleman, soldier and magnate in the Polish-Lithuanian Commonwealth
- Zygmunt Tarło (c. 1561 or 1562–1628), Polish–Lithuanian nobleman
- Zygmunt Unrug (1676–1732), Polish szlachta nobleman

=== Modern era ===
==== A–H ====
- Zygmunt Adamczyk (1923–1985), Polish footballer
- Zygmunt Ajdukiewicz (1861–1917), Polish realist painter
- Zygmunt Anczok (born 1946), Polish footballer
- Zygmunt Andrychiewicz (1861–1943), Polish painter of portraits, landscapes, and genre scenes
- Zygmunt Balicki (1858–1916), Polish sociologist
- Zygmunt Bauman (1925–2017), Polish sociologist
- Zygmunt Berling (1896–1980), Polish general
- Zygmunt Białostocki (1897–1942), Polish Jewish musician and composer
- Zygmunt Witymir Bieńkowski (1913–1979), Polish pilot and a writer of articles and poems
- Zygmunt Biesiadecki (1894–1944), Polish actor and director
- Zygmunt Wilhelm Birnbaum (1903–2000), Polish-American mathematician and statistician
- Zygmunt Bogdziewicz (1941–2016), Polish sports shooter
- Zygmunt Bohusz-Szyszko (1893–1982), Polish general
- Zygmunt Buhl (1927–1978), Polish sprinter
- Zygmunt Chmielewski (1894–1978), Polish film actor
- Zygmunt Choreń (born 1941), Polish naval architect
- Zygmunt Chruściński (1899–1952), Polish footballer
- Zygmunt Chychła (1926-2009), Polish boxer and 1952 Olympic welterweight champion
- Zygmunt Czerny (1888–1975), Polish romance philologist
- Zygmunt Czyżewski (1910–1998), Polish ice hockey and football player and football manager
- Zygmunt Szczęsny Feliński (1822–1895), professor of the Saint Petersburg Roman Catholic Theological Academy and Archbishop of Warsaw
- Zygmunt Frankiewicz (born 1955), Polish politician
- Zygmunt Gadecki (1938–2000), Polish footballer and Olympian
- Zygmunt Garłowski (1949–2008), Polish footballer
- Zygmunt Ginter (1916–1964), Polish ice hockey player
- Zygmunt Gloger (1845–1910), Polish historian, archaeologist, geographer and ethnographer
- Zygmunt Gorazdowski (1845–1920), Polish Roman Catholic priest
- Ziggy Gordon, Scottish footballer
- Zygmunt Grabowski (1891–1939), Polish painter
- Zygmunt Gross (born 1936), Polish professional footballer
- Zygmunt Grudziński (1870–1929), Polish radiologist
- Zygmunt Andrzej Heinrich (1937–1989), Polish mountaineer
- Zygmunt Heljasz (1908–1963), Polish shot putter and discus thrower
- Zygmunt Hübner (1930–1989), Polish film actor

==== J–M ====
- Zygmunt Jałoszyński (born 1946), Polish javelin thrower
- Zygmunt Janiszewski (1888–1920), Polish mathematician
- Zygmunt Kaczkowski (1825–1896), Polish writer, independence activist, and Austrian spy
- Zygmunt Kalinowski (born 1949), Polish former football goalkeeper
- Zygmunt Kałużyński (1918–2004), Polish film critic, lawyer, and TV personality
- Zygmunt Kamiński (1933–2010), Polish Roman Catholic archbishop
- Zygmunt Kamiński (1888–1969), Polish painter and professor at the Warsaw University of Technology
- Zygmunt Kawecki (born 1942), Polish fencer
- Zygmunt Kisielewski (1882–1942), Polish writer
- Zygmunt Kiszkurno (1921–2012), Polish sport shooter
- Zygmunt Klemensiewicz (1886–1963), Polish physicist and physical chemist
- Zygmunt Klukowski (1885–1959), Polish physician, historian, and bibliophile
- Zygmunt Konieczny (born 1937), Polish composer of theatre and film music
- Zygmunt Konieczny (1927–2003), Polish bobsledder
- Zygmunt Krasiński (1812–1859), Polish poet and nobleman
- Zygmunt Krauze (born 1938), Polish composer of contemporary classical music, educator, and pianist
- Zygmunt Krumholz (1903–1947), Polish footballer
- Zygmunt Kubiak (1929–2004), Polish writer, translator, and professor
- Zygmunt Kukla (born 1969), Polish conductor, arranger, and composer
- Zygmunt Kukla (1948-2016), Polish footballer
- Zygmunt Kulawik (1921–1982), Polish footballer
- Zygmunt Kurnatowski (1778–1858), Polish count and nobleman
- Zygmunt Kęstowicz (1921–2007), Polish actor
- Zygmunt Łanowski (1911–1989), Polish translator
- Zygmunt Laskowski (1841–1928), Polish physician, surgeon, and anatomist
- Zygmunt Latoszewski (1902–1995), Polish conductor, theater director, and music teacher
- Zygmunt Łempicki (1886–1943), Polish literature theoretician, Germanist, philosopher, and culture historian
- Zygmunt Łoboda (1895–1945), Polish architect
- Zygmunt Łoziński (1870–1932), Polish Roman Catholic bishop
- Zygmunt Malanowicz (1938–2021), Polish film actor
- Zygmunt Marek (1872–1931), Polish socialist politician
- Zygmunt Maszczyk (born 1945), Polish retired footballer
- Zigmund Red Mihalik (1916–1996), American basketball player and referee, member of the Basketball Hall of Fame
- Zygmunt Miłkowski (1824–1915), Polish romantic writer and politician
- Zygmunt Miłoszewski (born 1976), Polish writer and former journalist and editor
- Zygmunt Modzelewski (1900–1954), Polish communist politician, professor, economist, and diplomat
- Zygmunt Muchniewski (1896–1979), Polish politician, Christian Democratic Party head, and prime minister of the Polish Government in Exile
- Zygmunt Mycielski (1907–1987), Polish composer and music critic

==== N–S ====
- Zygmunt Noskowski (1846–1909), Polish composer, conductor and teacher
- Zygmunt Ochmański (1922–2003), Polish footballer
- Zygmunt Otto (1896–1961), Polish footballer
- Zygmunt Padlewski (1836–1863), Polish insurgent who participated in the January Uprising
- Zygmunt Pawlas (1930–2001), Polish fencer
- Zygmunt Pawłowicz (1927–2010), Polish Auxiliary bishop of the Roman Catholic Archdiocese of Gdańsk
- Žigmund Pálffy (born 1972), retired National Hockey League player from Slovakia
- Zygmunt Pieda (born 1933), Polish footballer
- Zygmunt A. Piotrowski (1904–1985), Polish born American psychologist
- Zygmunt Podhorski (1891–1960), Brigadier General of the Polish Army
- Zygmunt Puławski (1901–1931), Polish aircraft designer and pilot
- Zygmunt Pytko (1937–1996), Polish international speedway rider
- Zygmunt Rozwadowski (1870–1950), Polish painter
- Zygmunt Rumel (1915–1943), Polish poet and member of the Polish resistance in World War II
- Zygmunt Schmidt (born 1941), Polish footballer
- Zygmunt Siedlecki (1907–1977), Polish athlete and Olympic decathlete
- Zygmunt Sierakowski (1826–1863), Polish-Lithuanian leader of the January Uprising
- Zygmunt Smalcerz (born 1941), Polish weightlifting coach and retired weightlifter, 1972 Olympic flyweight champion
- Zygmunt Solorz (born 1956), Polish businessman and billionaire
- Zygmunt Steuermann (1899–1941), Polish footballer
- Zygmunt Stojowski (1870–1946), Polish pianist and composer
- Zygmunt Świechowski (1920–2015), Polish art historian and architectural conservator
- Zigmunt Ziggy Switkowski (born 1948), Australian businessman and nuclear physicist
- Zygmunt Szczotkowski (1877–1943), Polish mining engineer
- Zygmunt Szendzielarz (1910–1951), Polish military commander in World War II
- Zygmunt Szkopiak (1926–2002), Polish scientist, diplomat, and historian
- Zygmunt Szweykowski (historian) (1894–1978), historian of Polish literature
- Zygmunt Szweykowski (musicologist) (1929–2023), Polish musicologist

==== T–Z ====
- Zygmunt Turkow (1896–1970), Polish actor, playwright, and director
- Zygmunt Vetulani, computer scientist
- Zygmunt Vetulani (1894–1942), Polish diplomat and economist
- Zygmunt Vogel (1764–1826), Polish illustrator, educator, and classical painter
- Zygmunt Waliszewski (1897–1936), Polish painter in the Kapist movement
- Zygmunt Weiss (1903–1977), Polish sprinter and sport journalist
- Zygmunt Wiehler (1890–1977), Polish popular and film music composer and director
- Zygmunt Wielopolski (1833–1902), President of Warsaw
- Zigmunt Zygi Wilf (born 1950), owner of the Minnesota Vikings National Football League team
- Zygmunt Aleksander Wnęk (1918–1944), Polish soldier and military officer in World War II
- Zygmunt Wojciechowski (1900–1955), Polish historian and nationalist politician
- Zygmunt Florenty Wróblewski (1845–1888), Polish physicist and chemist
- Zygmunt Wrzodak (born 1959), Polish politician
- Zygmunt Zalcwasser (1898–1943), Polish mathematician and Holocaust victim
- Zygmunt Zaleski (1882–1967), Polish literature historian, literary critic, poet, publicist, and translator
- Zygmunt Załęski (1892–1966), Polish national movement activist, politician and publicist
- Zygmunt Zaremba (1895–1967), Polish socialist activist and publicist
- Zygmunt Zawirski (1882–1948), Polish philosopher and logician
- Zygmunt Zieliński (1858–1925), Polish general
- Zygmunt Ziembiński (1920–1996), Polish legal philosopher, logician, and theoretician of law
- Zygmunt Zimowski (1949–2016), Polish prelate of the Roman Catholic Church
- Zygmunt Zintel (1911–1990), Polish theater, film, and television, actor, and teacher
- Zygmunt Żuławski (1880–1949), Polish politician, association activist, and socialist

== Surname ==
- Antoni Zygmund (1900–1992), Polish mathematician
- Marcio Zygmunt (born 1996), Brazilian musician
- Paweł Zygmunt (born 1972), Polish retired speed skater
- Ted Zigmunt (born 1951), American politician

== See also ==
- Zsigmond Kornfeld (1852–1909), Hungarian banker and baron
- Zigmunds Skujiņš (born 1926), Latvian writer
