= Aleksander Rajchman =

Polish mathematician (1890–1940)

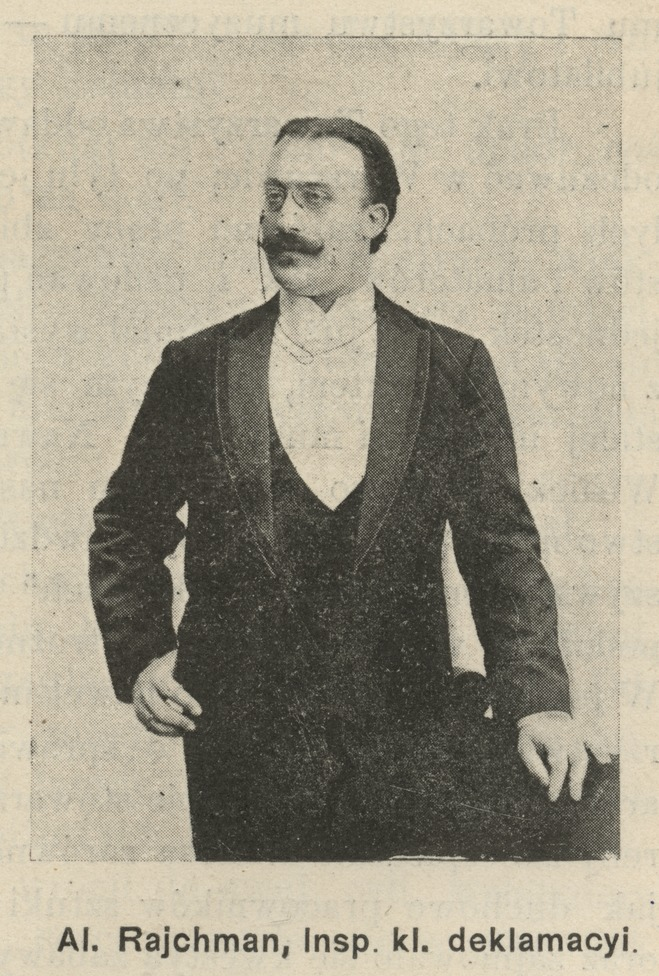
- Rajchman in 1896
- Born: 13 November 1890; Warsaw, Congress Poland, Russian Empire
- Died: July or August 1940; Sachsenhausen concentration camp, Oranienburg, Germany
- Education: John Casimir University of Lwów
- Known for: Rajchman global uniqueness theorem Rajchman measure Rajchman collection Rajchman algebra Rajchman lemma Rajchman sharpened law of large numbers Rajchman theory of formal multiplication of trigonometric series Rajchman inequality Rajchman-Zygmund inequality
- Scientific career
- Fields: Mathematics real analysis probability mathematical statistics Fourier analysis trigonometric series
- Workplaces: University of Warsaw; Collège de France
- Thesis: On uniqueness of representation of a function by a trigonometric series (1921)
- Doctoral advisor: Hugo Steinhaus
- Doctoral students: Antoni Zygmund; Zygmunt Zalcwasser

Notes
- Noted family members include: Aleksander Rajchman; Melania Rajchmanowa; Helena Radlińska; Ludwik Rajchman; Jan A. Rajchman; John Rajchman; Ludwik Hirszfeld

Aleksander Michał Rajchman (13 November 1890 – July or August 1940) was a Polish mathematician of the Warsaw School of Mathematics of the Interwar period. His early work was rooted within the Lwów School of Mathematics. He contributed to real analysis, probability and mathematical statistics.

== Family background ==
Rajchman was born on 13 November 1890 in Warsaw, Congress Poland, a province of the Russian Empire, in the family of assimilated Polish Jews known for contributions to the 20th-century Polish intellectual life. Although the family was partially converted into Roman Catholicism, his parents were agnostic. His father Aleksander Rajchman was a journalist specialized in theatre and music critique, who in the period 1882-1904 was the publisher and editor-in-chief of the artistic weekly Echo Muzyczne, Teatralne i Artystyczne and was co-founder and first director of the National Philharmonic in Warsaw in the years 1901–1904. Mother Melania Amelia Hirszfeld was a socialist and women's rights activist who wrote both critical essays and woman affairs' texts under pseudonyms or anonymously for a few Polish weeklies, organized maternal rallies where she drew attention to the need to improve the household to facilitate women's lives, and was an active member of the secret organization Women's Circle of Polish Crown and Lithuania, and later also the Association of Women's Equality in Warsaw. Rajchmans ran a social salon who hosted many Polish artists of their times, in particular Eliza Orzeszkowa, Maria Konopnicka, and Zenon Pietkiewicz.

His older sister a Polish independence activist and historian of education Helena Radlińska was the founder of Polish social pedagogy, his older brother a physician and bacteriologist Ludwik Rajchman was the world leader in social medicine and director of the League of Nations Health Organization, the founder of the United Nations International Children's Emergency Fund (UNICEF) and its first chairman in the years 1946–1950. His nephew a Polish-American electrical engineer Jan A. Rajchman was a computer pioneer who invented logic circuits for arithmetic and magnetic-core memory to result in development of high-speed computer memory systems and whose son John Rajchman is a noted American philosopher of art history, architecture, and continental philosophy. His first cousin a microbiologist and serologist Ludwik Hirszfeld co-discovered the heritability of ABO blood group type and foreseen the serological conflict between mother and child.

== Education and research work ==
After his father died in 1904, his mother migrated with rest of the family to Paris in 1909. Alexander studied there and obtained the licencié és sciences degree in 1910. He became a junior assistant at the University of Warsaw in 1919, whereas in 1921 he earned the doctoral degree at the John Casimir University of Lwów under Hugo Steinhaus and became a senior assistant at the University of Warsaw. Next in 1922 he became a professor at the University of Warsaw, and, after his habilitation in 1925, a lecturer there until outbreak of the World War II in 1939. In the 1930s, he was a visiting scholar to lecture at the Jacques Hadamard's seminar at the Collège de France. His research touched real analysis, probability and mathematical statistics, in particular focused on the Fourier series. Rajchman received significant results in the fields of trigonometric series, function of a real variable and probability. In mathematics, there are such concepts as the Rajchman global uniqueness theorem, Rajchman measures, Rajchman collection, Rajchman algebras, Rajchman sharpened law of large numbers, Rajchman theory of formal multiplication of trigonometric series, Rajchman inequalities, and Rajchman-Zygmund inequalities.

Near a Rajchman measure, particularly important notion invented by Rajchman is a Rajchman algebra associated with a locally compact group which is defined to be the set of all elements of the Fourier-Stieltjes algebra which vanish at infinity, a closed and complemented ideal in the Fourier-Stieltjes algebra that contains the Fourier algebra. His first doctoral student a noted Polish mathematician Antoni Zygmund created the Chicago school of mathematical analysis with the emphasis onto harmonic analysis, which produced the 1966 Fields Medal winner Paul Cohen. His second doctoral student Zygmunt Zalcwasser, co-advised by Wacław Sierpiński, introduced the Zalcwasser rank to measure the uniform convergence of sequences of continuous functions on the unit interval. In October 2000, the Stefan Banach International Mathematical Center at the Institute of Mathematics of the Polish Academy of Sciences honoured Rajchman's achievements by the Rajchman-Zygmund-Marcinkiewicz Symposium.

In April 1940, the Gestapo arrested Rajchman as a Jew. He died in Sachsenhausen concentration camp, Oranienburg, Germany probably in July or August 1940.

== See also ==
- List of Polish mathematicians
