= Centipede (disambiguation) =

A centipede is an arthropod belonging to the class Chilopoda.

Centipede may also refer to:

- Centipede (album), by Rebbie Jackson
- Centipede (band), U.K. band led by Keith Tippett
- Centipede (film), a 2018 Iranian film
- "Centipede" (Rebbie Jackson song), 1984
- "Centipede" (Knife Party song), 2012
- Centipede (video game), arcade game by Atari
- Centipede (1998 video game), remake of the arcade game
- Centipede game, in game theory
- Centipede mathematics
- Centipede grass, Eremochloa ophiuroides, a warm season lawn grass
- Centipede plant, Homalocladium platycladum, also called Tapeworm Plant or Ribbon Bush
- Centipede Nunatak
- Centipede Press, an American publisher
- Locomotive Baldwin DR-12-8-1500/2, nicknamed Centipede

== See also ==
- Sea centipede, a common name given to various sea creatures
- Millipede (disambiguation)
