= Zyga the Lamplighter Monument =

Statue in Poznań, Poland

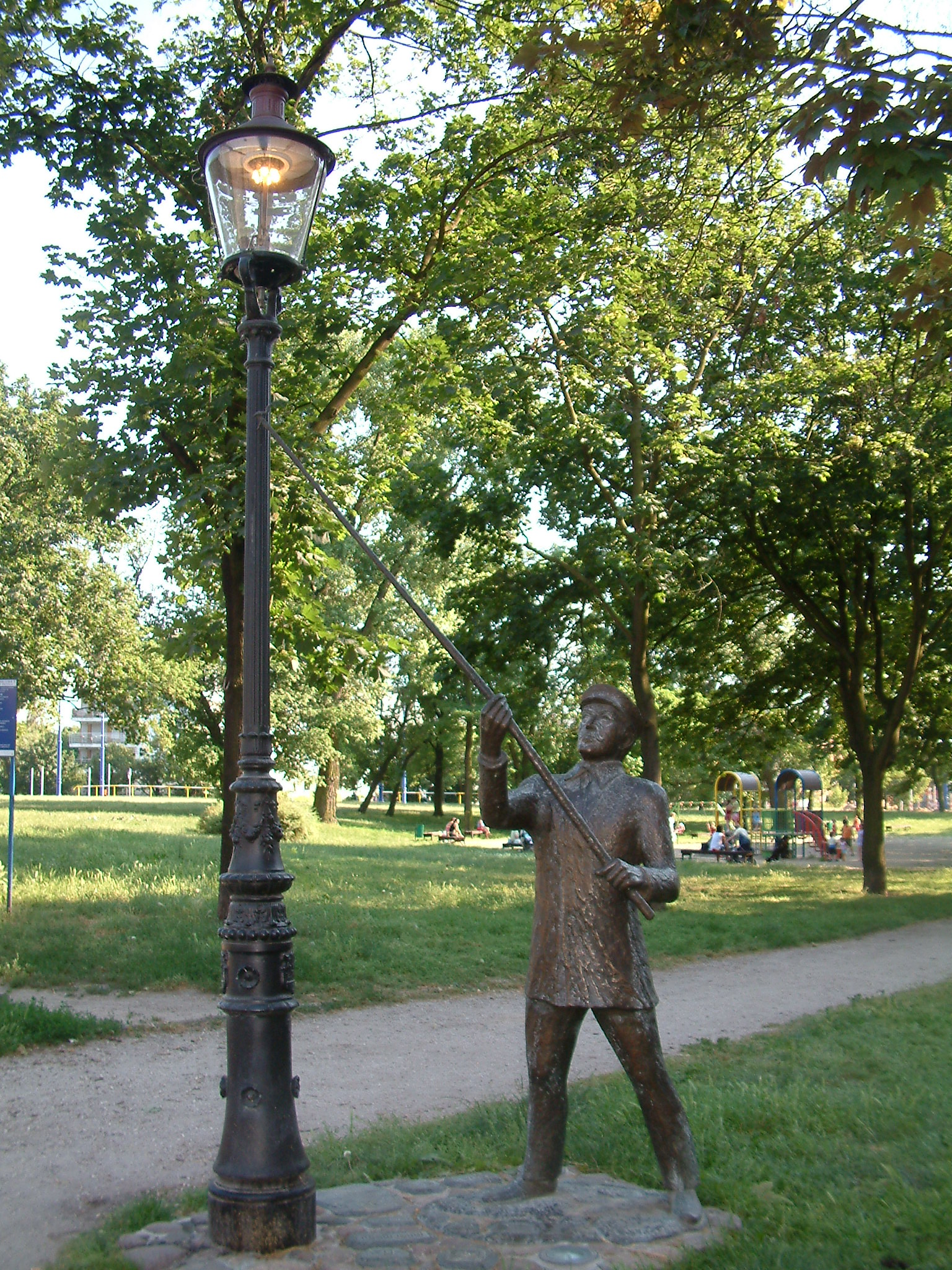
- Statue in 2007.
- Interactive map of Zyga the Lamplighter Monument
- Location: Łukasiewicz Square, Poznań, Poland
- Coordinates: 52°24′13.4″N 16°56′33.1″E
- Designer: Robert Sobociński
- Type: Statue
- Material: Bronze
- Opening date: 29 May 2003

Zyga the Lamplighter Monument (Polish pronunciation: [ˈzɘ̟.ɡa]; Polish: Pomnik Zygi Latarnika) is a bronze statue in Poznań, Poland, in the Łukasiewicz Square near Za Groblą Street, within the Old Town neighbourhood. It depicts a lamplighter named Zyga, using a pole to light up a nearby gas street light. It was designed by Robert Sobociński and unveiled on 29 May 2003.

== History ==
The sculpture was designed by Robert Sobociński, and unveiled on 29 May 2003. It was created as part of the social action organized by newspaper Gazeta Wyborcza and gas company Wielkopolska Spółka Gazownictwa, with the objective of preserving the gas street lights in the city. The sculpture was placed next to the historic street light, that was relocated from Słowackiego Street in the neighbourhood of Jeżyce, and throughoutly renovated.

== Characteristics ==
The bronze sculpture depicts a fictional lamplighter named Zyga, wearing a coat and hat, and using a pole to light up a nearby gas street light. Zyga is a nickname for Zygmunt (Sigmund) in Poznań subdialect. The monument is located in Łukasiewicz Square near Za Groblą Street, and placed near the historic Grobla Street Gasworks.
