= Zygmunt Łanowski =

Polish translator

Zygmunt Łanowski (31 July 1911 – 30 August 1989) was a Polish translator of Swedish, Finnish, Icelandic, Norwegian and English language literature.

== Early life and education ==
Son of Feliks Łanowski and Wiktoria née Piwocki, he was born in Tarnopol and attended the classical III State Male Gymnasium named after King Stefan Batory in Lviv. In the years 1930–35 he studied law and diplomacy at the University of Lviv (University of John Casimir). After graduation, he became an assistant in the department of law at the same university.

During World War II, he was an officer of the Home Army, he was active in Żegota and cooperated with the Delegate of the Government in Exile, Adam Ostrowski. He was also the head of the radio monitoring of the Information and Propaganda Bureau of the Lviv Area.

In July 1944, after the Red Army entered Lviv, he was appointed adjutant to general Władysław Filipkowski, then arrested by the Soviets. From August 2, 1944 to December 9, 1947, he was imprisoned by the NKVD, first in the Diagilewo camp near Ryazan, then in the Shora camp in the Mari ASSR where he became seriously ill with tuberculosis. At the end of 1947, he was transported back to Poland.

In 1948, thanks to the help of the Swedish program Europahjälpen, he ended up in Sweden, where he underwent treatment and convalescence. From 1951 he was under the care of the Swedish humanitarian action, he spent almost eight years in Sweden and learned the Swedish language fluently. He returned to Poland in 1954 and settled in Warsaw.

As a translator of Swedish literature, he made his debut in 1956 with the translation of Birger Vikström's short story Złote czas in the New signals magazine (Nowe signals, 1956, no. 8). He was the editor of an anthology of Swedish poetry and stories and a translator of works published as part of the Series of Scandinavian Writers.

Łanowski's translation output includes both the classics of Swedish literature (plays and novellas by August Strindberg, the prose of Pär Lagerkvist, Artur Lundkvist, Eyvind Johnson, anthologies of Swedish short stories and poetry), works of children's and youth literature (Hans Peterson, Olle Matson), film scripts (Ingmar Bergman), travel literature (Eric Lundquist, Thor Heyerdahl), sensational and criminal literature (Hans Krister Rönblom).

== Awards ==
In 1968, he was the first Pole to receive the Swedish Academy award for translators of Swedish literature, and in 1977 an honorary doctorate from the University of Uppsala.

In 1981, he received the Polish PEN Club Prize for translating foreign literature into Polish .

He was also awarded the Knight's Cross of the Order of Polonia Restituta, the Medal of the 40th Anniversary of People's Poland, as well as the Swedish Knight's Cross of the Order of Vasa and the Knight's Cross of the Order of the Polar Star.

== Translation works ==
- Frans Gunnar Bengtsson, Rudy Orm.
  - Ingmar Bergman (film scripts)
  - Laterna magicica
  - Fanny and Alexander
  - From the life of puppets
  - Snake's egg
  - Autumn Sonata
  - Face to face
- Lars Bergquist, Memoirs of Arronax
- Rolf Blomberg
  - Bufo blombergi: hikes and adventures (selection)
  - Gold and anacondas
- Bo Carpelan
  - Paradise
  - Arch: a story about a summer that was different
- Sven Delblanc
  - Speranza: A Contemporary Novel
  - The river of remembrance

Per Olov Enqvist, Night of Tribad

- Per Gunnar Evander. The last day in the life of Vale Hedman
- Lars Gustafsson
  - Death of the beekeeper
  - Family holiday
  - Wool
- Lars Gyllensten, The Diary of Cain
- Gunnar Harding, Poems (selection)

Thor Heyerdahl, Expedition Ra

- Tove Jansson, Summer
- Eyvind Johnson
  - Clouds over Metapont
  - The surf waves
- Sylvi Kekkonen, Amalia
- Gösta Knutsson, The Adventures of Filonka Bezogonka
- Pär Lagerkvist
  - Angle
  - Midget
  - Mariamne
  - Evil
  - Sibyl
  - Pilgrim
  - A visitor, in fact
- Halldor Kiljan Laxness, The Flutist
- Sara Lidman, Conversations in Hanoi
- Gunnel Linde
  - Our Eve's country
  - Lurituri
  - A white stone
  - Lurituri
- Max Lundgren, The Boy in the Golden Pants
- Arthur Lundkvist
  - The will of heaven
  - Poetry in prose (selection)
  - The Fall of Jericho: Stories (selection)
  - Vindingen waltz
  - Horses of the night and other stories about the world, people and myths (selection)
  - Wind rose: travel experiences (selection)
  - Frieze of life: novellas and short stories (selection)
- Eric Lundquist, the Wilds are us
- Olle Mattson
  - Beach holiday
  - Brig "Trzy Lilies"
- Folke Mellvig, Shots in Kalmar
- Henry Miller, Smile at the Foot of the Ladder
- Jan Olof Olsson, Margareta Sjögren Niż over Ireland
- Hans Peterson
  - Peter in the countryside
  - It's me, Piotr
- Pär Rådström, Murder
- Hans Krister Rönblom, Death in a Pot
- August Strindberg
  - dramas: Miss Julia, Father, Creditors, Stronger, To Damascus, Erik XIV, Game of Dreams, Sonata of Ghosts, Dance of Death, Storm, Burnt, Krystyna, Sonata of Ghosts, Pelican, Master Olof, Colleagues, First Warning, Crimes and Crimes, Easter, Charles XII, Gustav III, Wielki Gościniec, Parias,
  - novellas: Doll's house, Prize for virtue, Musiał, For payment, Remorse, Romantic sacristan from Rånö, Pastor's moose, Vow, Tailor arranges dances, Customs officer, Girls' love, Panning.
  - manifestos: director's memorandum to members of the Intima Teatern ensemble
- Per Olof Sundman
  - Expedition
  - Two days, two nights
  - Mr. Andree's engineer overhead voyage
- Birgitta Trotzig, Barbara (translated together with Maria Olszańska)
- Mika Waltari (translations from Swedish)
  - Egyptian Sinuhe
  - Karin, daughter of Mons
  - A black angel
  - Turms, immortal.
  - Mikael Karvajalka
  - Mikael Hakim
- Maria Wine
  - Poems (selection)
  - A lion was shot: a selection of short stories and short stories (selection)

Zygmunt Łanowski was also the author of the selection and the translator of works in the anthologies:

- Human fate: an anthology of Swedish short stories and short stories. Poznań: Poznań Publishing House. 1965.
- Roads in the Deep: an anthology of Swedish Sea Prose. Gdansk: Morskie Publishing House, 1971.
- Ivory: Swedish novellas. Warsaw: Reader. 1972.
- At the extreme seashore: an anthology of 20th century Swedish maritime poetry. Gdańsk: Morskie Publishing House, 1978. ISBN 83-215-6427-5

and editor of the following anthologies:

- South of the Sahara: African Stories. Warsaw: State Publishing Institute, 1967.
- Fertile granite: an anthology of Finnish fiction and stories. Poznań: Poznań Publishing House, 1970.
- Werner Aspenström, Poems. Warsaw: UW Publishing House, 1976.
- In the room of mirrors: an anthology of Swedish poetry (1928-1978). Poznań: Poznań Publishing House, 1980. ISBN 83-210-0075-4
