= Calderón projector =

In applied mathematics, the Calderón projector is a pseudo-differential operator used widely in boundary element methods. It is named after Alberto Calderón.

== Definition ==
The interior Calderón projector is defined to be:

$\mathcal{C}_{\Omega}=\left(\begin{array}{cc}(1-\sigma)\mathsf{Id}-\mathsf{K}&\mathsf{V}\\\mathsf{W}&\sigma\mathsf{Id}+\mathsf{K}'\end{array}\right),$

where $\sigma$ is $\tfrac12$ almost everywhere, $\mathsf{Id}$ is the identity boundary operator, $\mathsf{K}$ is the double layer boundary operator, $\mathsf{V}$ is the single layer boundary operator, $\mathsf{K}'$ is the adjoint double layer boundary operator and $\mathsf{W}$ is the hypersingular boundary operator; on a given bounded domain $\Omega$ with compact boundary $\Gamma$.

The exterior Calderón projector on a complementary domain $\Omega^c = \mathbb R^n - \Omega$ (taking its interior) is defined to be:

$$\mathcal{C}_{\Omega^c}=\left(\begin{array}{cc}\sigma\mathsf{Id}+\mathsf{K}&-\mathsf{V}\\-\mathsf{W}&(1-\sigma)\mathsf{Id}-\mathsf{K}'\end{array}\right).$$

That is also linked to the interior Calderón projector by $\mathcal{C}_{\Omega^c} = \mathcal I - \mathcal{C}_{\Omega}$.

== Calderón identities ==
As the Calderón operator is a projector; that means that $\mathcal{C}_{\Omega}^2 = \mathcal{C}_{\Omega}$, the following identities holds :

$VW = \frac 14 Id - K^2$

$WV = \frac 14 Id - K'^2$

$KV = VK'$

$WK = K'W$
