= Artur Lundkvist =

Swedish writer (1906–1991)

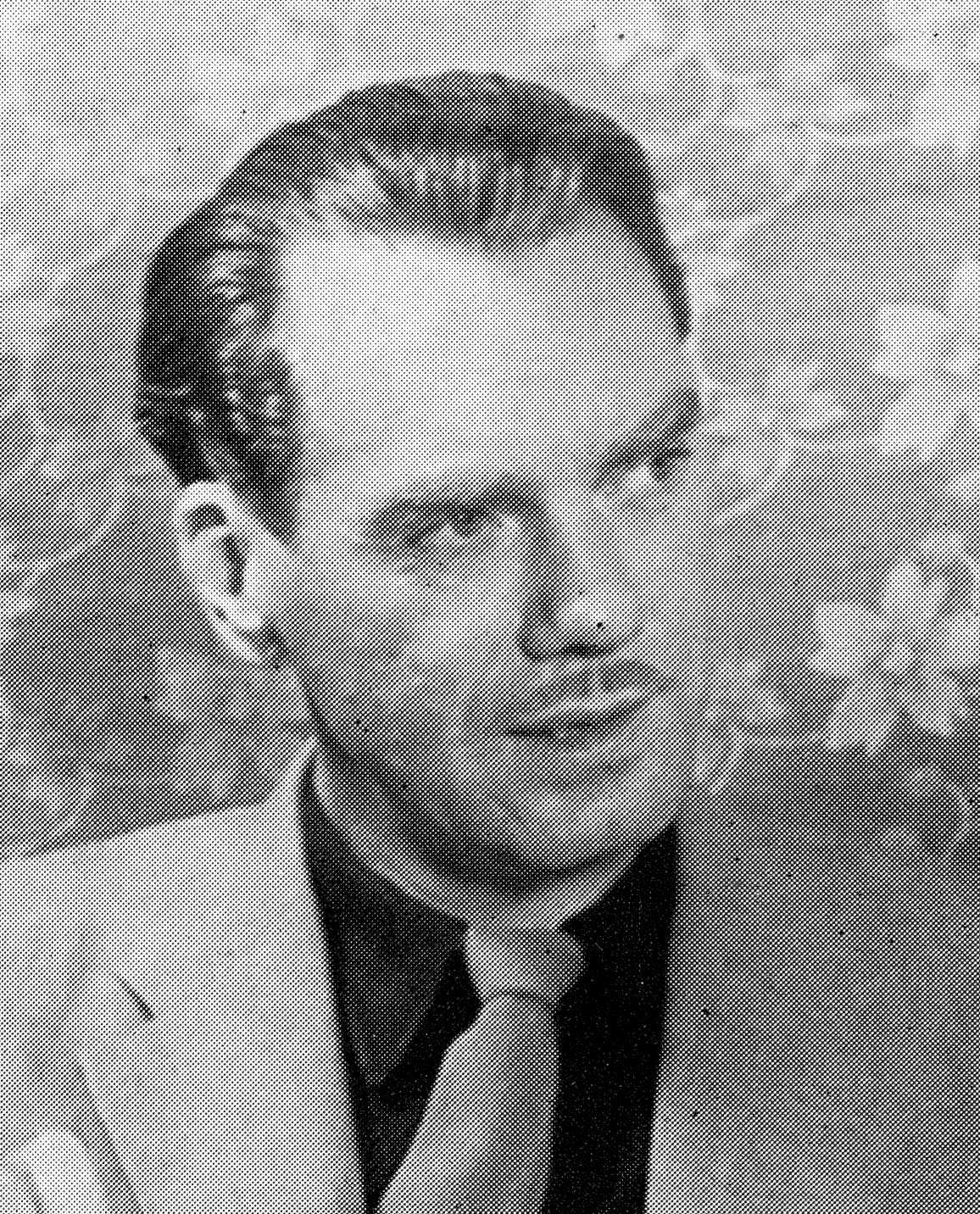
Artur Lundkvist, 1940s.

Nils Artur Lundkvist (3 March 1906 – 11 December 1991) was a Swedish writer, poet and literary critic. He was a member of the Swedish Academy from 1968.

Artur Lundkvist published around 80 books, including poetry, prose poems, essays, short stories, novels and travel books, and his works have been translated into some 30 languages. He is also noted for having translated many works from Spanish and French into Swedish. Several authors whose works he translated were later awarded the Nobel Prize in Literature. He married the poet Maria Wine in 1936.

== Biography ==
Artur Lundkvist was born in Perstorp Municipality, Skåne County. As a child he lived on a small farm, first in Hagstad and then in nearby Toarp. From an early age his main interest was reading and he also liked wandering in the surrounding countryside. At the age of twenty Lundkvist moved to Stockholm determined to become a writer, he studied at a Folk high school and became acquainted with other young people with the same interests. His first books of poems, the anthology Fem unga and introductions of foreign modernist literature quickly established Lundkvist as a leading figure in Modernist Swedish literature in the 1930s. Lundkvist went on to publish more than 80 books in many genres and was also a prominent critic. In 1968 he was elected a member of the Swedish Academy, and was a member of the Academy's Nobel committee from 1969 to 1986. He was married to Maria Wine since 1936 and died on 11 December 1991.

== Literary career ==
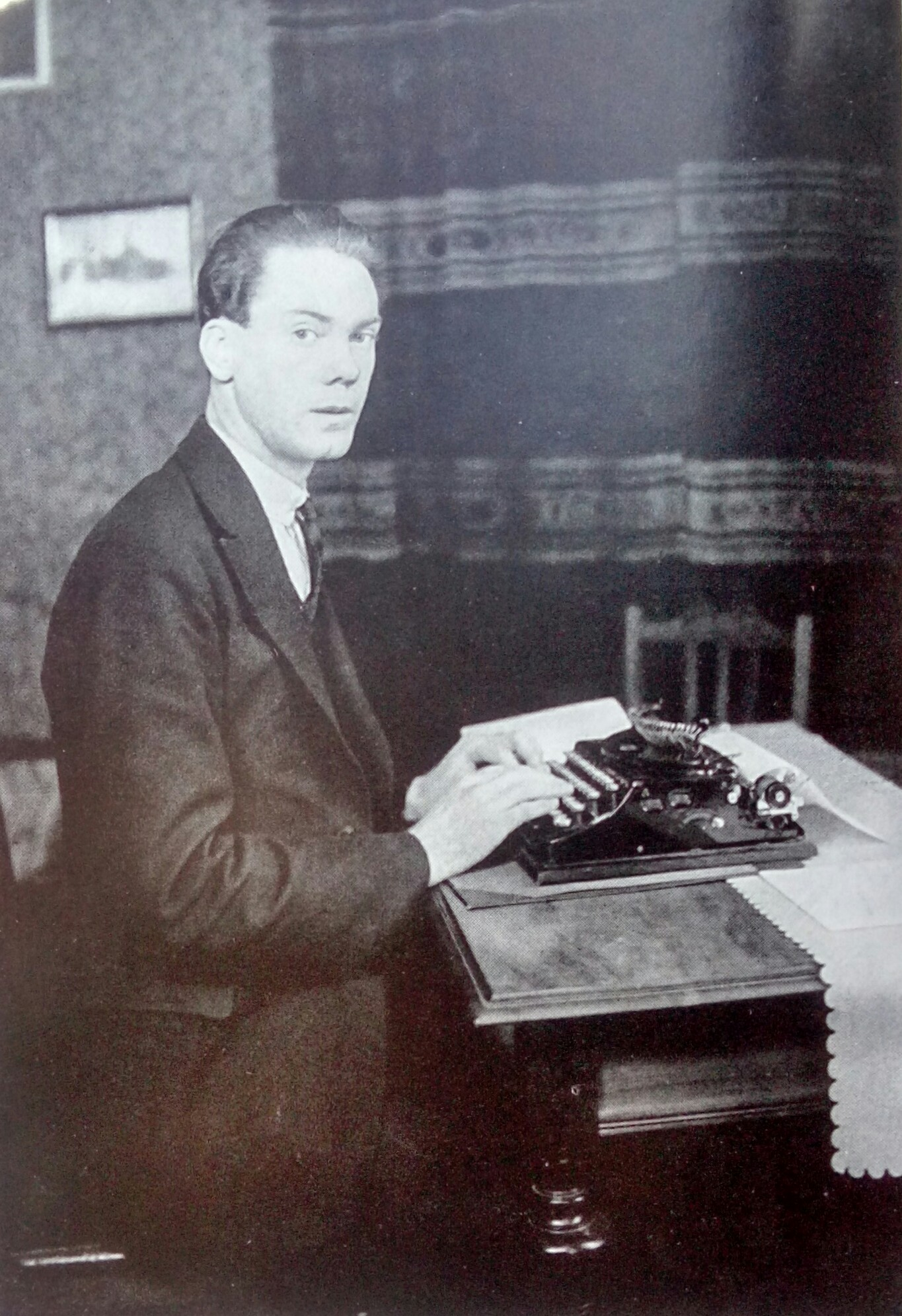
Artur Lundkvist 1931.

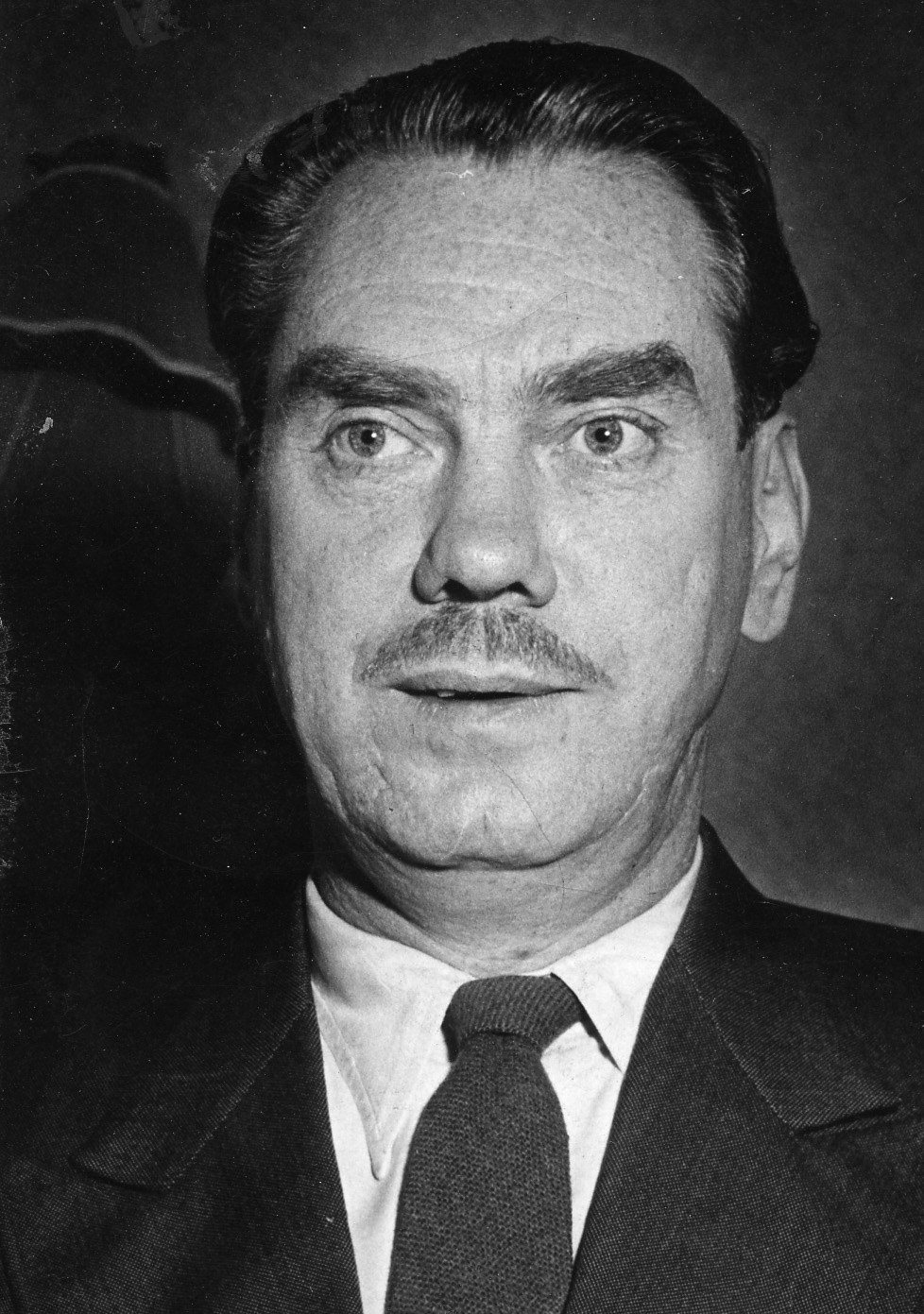
Artur Lundkvist 1952.

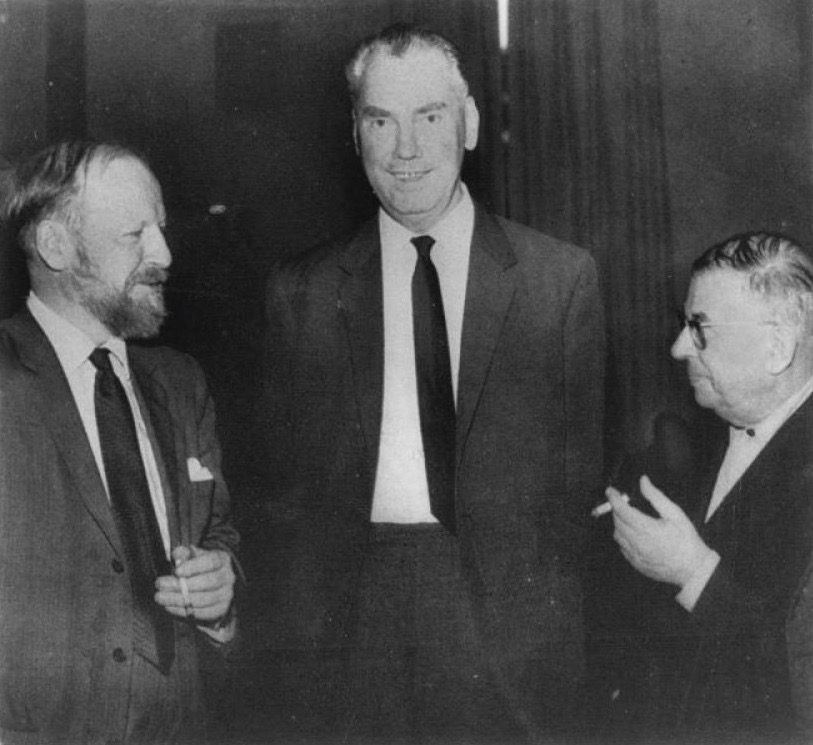
Artur Lundkvist with William Golding and Jean-Paul Sartre at a writers' congress in Leningrad, USSR, 1963.

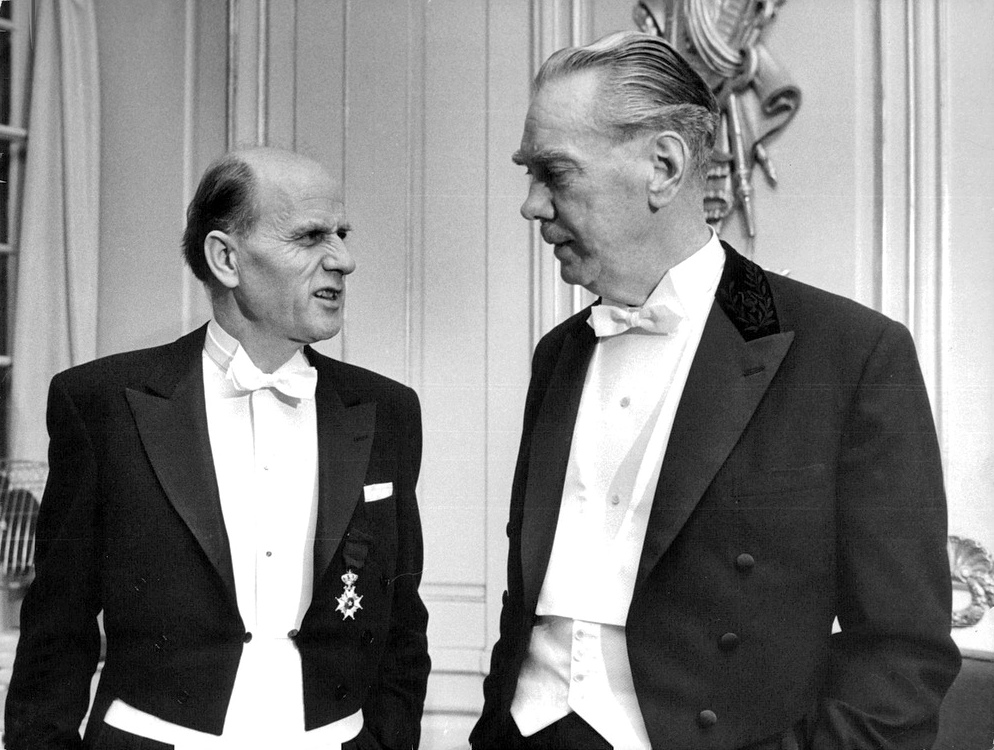
Artur Lundkvist (right) at the Swedish Academy in 1968.

Lundkvist published his first book of poems Glöd (Glowing Embers) in 1928 and contributed to the important anthology Fem unga (Five young men) in 1929. He was one of the dominant figures in Swedish literary modernism, the most vigorous promoter of the modernist breakthrough that took place around 1930, and one of the leading poets of the period. His early works was influenced by Scandinavian and American modernists, most notably Carl Sandburg, and later by surrealism.

In the late 1940s his works became increasingly influenced by Spanish language writers like Pablo Neruda and Federico García Lorca, whose poetry he also translated to Swedish. Although he continued to publish books of poetry, including Liv som gräs (Life as grass, 1954) and Ögonblick och vågor (Moments and waves, 1962) which by many is considered to be among his finest works, prose works dominated his writings from the 1950s and onwards. In several books, starting with Malinga (1952) and leading up to late works such as Skrivet mot kvällen (Written towards the evening, 1980), his ambition was to defy genre limitations and merge prose poetry, fictional stories, short essays, personal memoirs and impressions from his many travels around the world into a new form of literature. A selection of Lundkvist's prose poems was published in English translation with the title The Talking Tree: Poems in Prose in 1982.

Artur Lundkvist was a very productive writer. His many literary works are broadly varied in subject, style and genre and often stretched the boundaries of established forms. He was praised by Swedish critics as one of the greatest Swedish modernist poets and also published numerous articles, short stories, novels, collections of literary essays, and books about his travels in South America, India, China, the Soviet Union and Africa. In his acclaimed, book-length poem Agadir he recounted the 1960 Agadir earthquake. Lundkvist visited Agadir at the time and survived the earthquake that killed or injured forty thousand inhabitants of the city.

As a literature critic, and also translator, he introduced foreign literature to Swedish readers, including several authors that would subsequently be awarded the Nobel Prize in Literature, such as William Faulkner, T. S. Eliot, Pablo Neruda, Claude Simon, Vicente Aleixandre, Octavio Paz, Gabriel Garcia Marquez and Mario Vargas Llosa. His later work also include several historical novels such as Snapphanens liv och död (1968, about snapphanar), Tvivla, korsfarare! (1972, about crusaders), Krigarens dikt (1976, about Alexander the Great) and Slavar för Särkland (1978, about vikings). In his 1984 book Färdas i drömmen och föreställningen, translated to English as Journeys in Dream and Imagination, Lundkvist recounted the dreams he experienced during a sixty day coma following a heart attack in 1981 he miraculously recovered from.

In 1966 his autobiography Självporträtt av en drömmare med öppna ögon (Self portrait of a dreamer with open eyes) was published, and in 1968 he was elected a member of the Swedish Academy. For many years he was an influential member of the Swedish Academy's Nobel Committee for Literature.

Lundkvist was awarded a number of Swedish literary prizes, including the Dobloug Prize. In 1977 he was awarded the prestigious Golden Wreath of the Struga Poetry Evenings festival in Struga, North Macedonia. He died in Solna, Stockholm County.

== Political activism ==
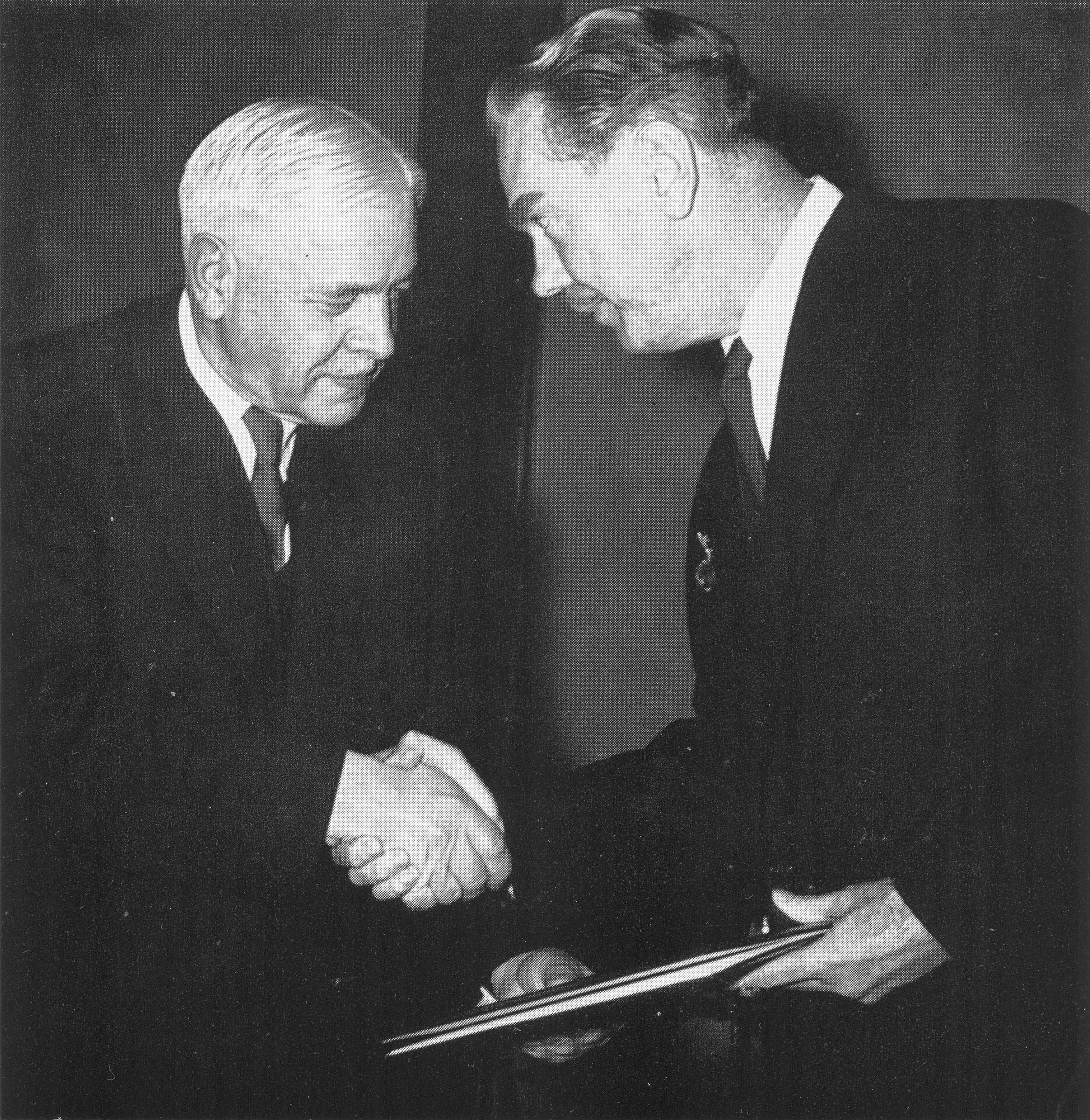
Artur Lundkvist accepts the Lenin Peace Prize in 1958.

Artur Lundkvist was a supporter of the Soviet Union and communism. Lundkvist himself, however, never accepted being labelled as a communist, instead calling himself a "free socialist". During the Cold War, Lundkvist was an adherent of the so-called "third stance" (Swedish: tredje ståndpunkten) in Swedish public debate, which purported to advocate a neutral stance in the conflict between the two superpowers. He served on the board of the pro-communist Sweden-GDR Association. He was also a member of the Swedish Peace Committee, the Swedish section of the World Peace Council, a Soviet front organization. In 1958 he was awarded the Lenin Peace Prize from the Soviet Union.

== Selected works ==
- Glöd 1928
- Naket liv 1929
- Jordisk prosa 1930
- Svart stad 1930
- Vit man 1932
- Atlantvind 1932
- Floderna flyter mot havet 1934
- Himmelsfärd 1935
- Nattens broar 1936
- Sirensång 1937
- Eldtema 1939
- Ikarus' flykt 1939
- Korsväg 1942
- Dikter mellan djur och gud 1944
- Skinn över sten 1947
- Fotspår i vattnet 1949
- Indiabrand 1950
- Malinga 1952
- Liv som gräs 1954
- Den förvandlade draken 1955
- Vindingevals 1956
- Berget och svalorna 1957
- Vulkanisk kontinent 1957
- Ur en befolkad ensamhet 1958
- Komedi i Hägerskog 1959
- Utsikter över utländsk prosa 1959
- Det talande trädet 1960
- Agadir 1961
- Berättelser för vilsekomna 1961
- Sida vid sida 1962
- Ögonblick och vågor 1962
- Drömmar i ovädrens tid 1963
- Texter i snön 1964
- Sällskap för natten 1965
- Självporträtt av en drömmare med öppna ögon 1966
- Snapphanens liv och död 1968
- Utflykter med utländska författare 1969
- Himlens vilja 1970
- Antipodien 1971
- Tvivla, korsfarare! 1972
- Lustgårdens demoni 1973
- Fantasins slott och vardagens stenar 1974
- Livsälskare, svartmålare 1975
- Världens härlighet 1975
- Krigarens dikt 1976
- Sett i det strömmande vattnet 1978
- Slavar för Särkland 1978
- Utvandring till paradiset 1979
- Skrivet mot kvällen 1980
- Babylon, gudarnas sköka 1981
- Sinnebilder 1982
- Färdas i drömmen och föreställningen 1984

Translations in English

- Agadir, translation by William Jay Smith and Leif Sjöberg, Ohio University Press 1979
- The Talking Tree: Poems in Prose, translation by Diana W. Wormuth with Stephen P. Sondrup, Bingham Young University Press 1982
- Journeys in Dream and Imagination, translation by Ann B. Weissman and Annika Planck, Four Walls Eight Windows, New York 1991

Cultural offices
Preceded by Gunnar Ekelöf	Swedish Academy, Seat No.18; 1968-1991	Succeeded by Katarina Frostenson
