= Trigonometric Series =

Two-volume set of books by Antoni Zygmund

- Author: Antoni Zygmund
- Subject: Trigonometric series
- Published: 1935, 1959, 2002

Antoni Zygmund wrote a classic two-volume set of books entitled Trigonometric Series, which discusses many different aspects of trigonometric series. The first edition was a single volume, published in 1935 (under the slightly different title Trigonometrical Series). The second edition of 1959 was greatly expanded, taking up two volumes, though it was later reprinted as a single volume paperback. The third edition of 2002 is similar to the second edition, with the addition of a preface by Robert A. Fefferman on more recent developments, in particular Carleson's theorem about almost everywhere pointwise convergence for square-integrable functions.

== Publication history ==
- Zygmund, Antoni (1935). Trigonometrical series. Monogr. Mat. Vol. 5. Warszawa, Lwow: Subwencji Fundusz Kultury Narodowej. Zbl 0011.01703. At icm.edu.pl: original archived
- Zygmund, Antoni (1952). Trigonometrical series. New York: Chelsea Publishing Co. MR 0076084.
- Zygmund, Antoni (1955). Trigonometrical series. New York: Dover Publications. MR 0072976.
- Zygmund, Antoni (1959). Trigonometric series (2nd ed.). Cambridge University Press. MR 0107776. Volume I, Volume II.
- Zygmund, Antoni (1968). Trigonometric series. Second edition, reprinted with corrections and some additions. Vol. I and II (2nd ed.). Cambridge University Press. MR 0236587.
- Zygmund, Antoni (1977). Trigonometric series. Vol. I and II. Cambridge University Press. ISBN 978-0-521-07477-3. MR 0617944.
- Zygmund, Antoni (1988). Trigonometric series. Cambridge Mathematical Library. Vol. I and II. Cambridge University Press. ISBN 978-0-521-35885-9. MR 0933759.
- Zygmund, Antoni (2002). Fefferman, Robert A. (ed.). Trigonometric series. Cambridge Mathematical Library. Vol. I and II (3rd ed.). Cambridge University Press. ISBN 978-0-521-89053-3. MR 1963498.

== Reviews ==
- Kahane, Jean-Pierre (2004), "Book review: Trigonometric series, Vols. I, II", Bulletin of the American Mathematical Society, 41 (3): 377–390, doi:10.1090/s0273-0979-04-01013-4, ISSN 0002-9904
- Salem, Raphael (1960), "Book Review: Trigonometric series", Bulletin of the American Mathematical Society, 66 (1): 6–12, doi:10.1090/S0002-9904-1960-10362-X, ISSN 0002-9904, MR 1566029
- Tamarkin, J. D. (1936), "Zygmund on Trigonometric Series", Bull. Amer. Math. Soc., 42 (1): 11–13, doi:10.1090/s0002-9904-1936-06235-x
