= Mischa Cotlar =

Argentine mathematician

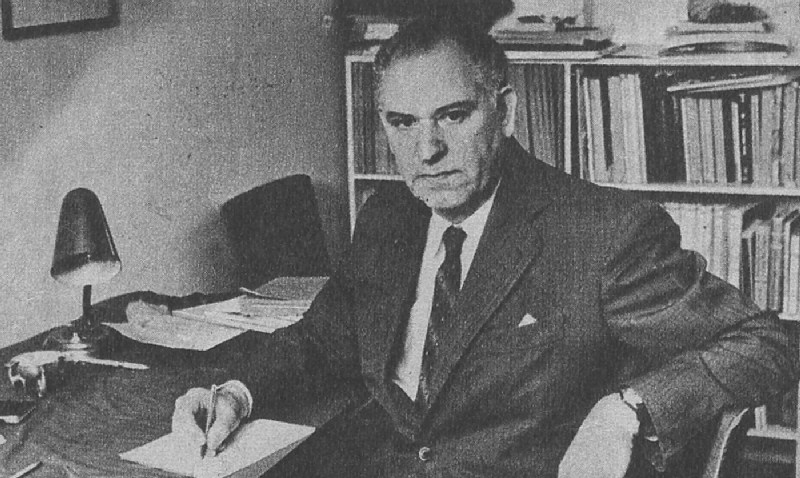
Mischa Cotlar in 1964

Mischa Cotlar (1913, Sarny, Russian Empire – January 16, 2007, Buenos Aires, Argentina) was a mathematician who started his scientific career in Uruguay and worked most of his life on it in Argentina and Venezuela.

His contributions to mathematics are in the fields of harmonic analysis, ergodic theory and spectral theory. He introduced the Cotlar–Stein lemma. He was the author or co-author of over 80 articles in refereed journals.

According to Alberto Calderón, Cotlar showed in 1955 "that theorems on singular integrals can be generalized and put in the framework of ergodic theory." According to Krause, Lacey, and Wierdl, Karl E. Petersen in 1983 published an "especially direct proof" of Cotlar's 1955 theorem.

In January 1994 in Caracas, an international conference was held in his honor.

== Selected publications ==
- Aritmética abstracta, Boletín de la Facultad de Ingeniería, Montevideo, Uruguay, 1937
- Teoría de anágenos, An. Soc. Ci. Argentina, 127, 1939
- Familias normales de funciones no analíticas, An. Soc. Ci. Argentina 129, 1940
- Un método para obtener congruencias de números de Bernoulli, Math. Notae 7, 1947
- On The Foundation Of The Ergodic Theory, Actas Symposia, UNESCO, 1951
- Cotlar, Mischa (July 1954). "On a theorem of Beurling and Kaplansky" (PDF). Pacific Journal of Mathematics. 4 (3): 459–466. doi:10.2140/pjm.1954.4.459.
- with R. Ricabarra: Cotlar, M.; Ricabarra, R. (1954). "On the Existence of Characters in Topological Groups". American Journal of Mathematics. 76 (2): 375–388. doi:10.2307/2372579. JSTOR 2372579.
- A combinatorial inequality and its application to L^{2} spaces, Math. Cuyana, 1, 1955
- "Sobre lat Teoria algebraica de la Medida y el Teorema de Hahn-Banach" (PDF). Revista de la Unión Matemática Argentina. 17: 9–24. 1956.
- with R. Panzone: "Generalized potential operators" (PDF). Revista de la Unión Matemática Argentina. 19: 3–41. 1960.
- Convolution Operators and Factorization, McGill Analysis Seminar, McGill University, Montreal, 1972
- "Moment Theory and Continuity of Hilbert and Poisson Transforms in L^{2} Spaces by M. Cotlar". Functional Analysis, Holomorphy, and Approximation Theory (1st ed.). CRC Press. 1983. doi:10.1201/9781003072577-4. ISBN 9781003072577. S2CID 236816646.
- "The Helson-Szegö Theorem in L^{p} by M. Cotlar and C. Sadosky". In: Harmonic Analysis and Partial Differential Equations: Proceedings of a Conference Held April 4-5, 1988. Contemporary Mathematics, vol. 107. American Mathematical Soc. 1990. pp. 19–37. ISBN 9780821851135.
- with C. Sadosky: Cotlar, M.; Sadosky, C. (1994). "Nehari and Nevanlinna-Pick Problems and Holomorphic Extensions in the Polydisk in Terms of Restricted BMO". Journal of Functional Analysis. 124: 205–210. doi:10.1006/jfan.1994.1105.
- with Pedro Alegría: Albgría, Pedro; Cotlar, Mischa (1998). "Generalized Toeplitz Forms and Interpolation Colligations". Mathematische Nachrichten. 190: 5–29. doi:10.1002/mana.19981900102. S2CID 121531260.
