= Cimoszka =

- Settlement
- Location within Poland
- Coordinates: 53°25′22″N 23°17′15″E
- Country: Poland
- Voivodeship: Podlaskie
- County: Sokółka
- Gmina: Janów

Cimoszka [t͡ɕiˈmɔʂka] is a settlement in the administrative district of Gmina Janów, within Sokółka County, Podlaskie Voivodeship, in north-eastern Poland.

The village is the birthplace of Polish mathematician Józef Marcinkiewicz (1910–1940).
