= Millipede (disambiguation) =

A millipede is a myriapod with two pairs of legs on most segments.

Millipede may also refer to:

- Millipede (video game), a 1982 arcade game sequel to Centipede
- Millipede memory, non-volatile computer memory

== See also ==
- Centipede (disambiguation)
