= Cotlar–Stein lemma =

The Cotlar–Stein almost orthogonality lemma is a mathematical lemma in the field of functional analysis. It may be used to obtain information on the operator norm on an operator, acting from one Hilbert space into another, when the operator can be decomposed into almost orthogonal pieces.

The original version of this lemma (for self-adjoint and mutually commuting operators) was proved by Mischa Cotlar in 1955 and allowed him to conclude that the Hilbert transform is a continuous linear operator in $L^2$ without using the Fourier transform. A more general version was proved by Elias Stein.

== Statement of the lemma ==
Let $E,\,F$ be two Hilbert spaces. Consider a family of operators $T_j$, $j\geq 1$, with each $T_j$ a bounded linear operator from $E$ to $F$.

Denote

$$a_{jk}=\Vert T_j T_k^\ast\Vert,
\qquad b_{jk}=\Vert T_j^\ast T_k\Vert.$$

The family of operators $T_j:\;E\to F$, $j\ge 1,$ is almost orthogonal if

$$A=\sup_{j}\sum_{k}\sqrt{a_{jk}}<\infty,
\qquad B=\sup_{j}\sum_{k}\sqrt{b_{jk}}<\infty.$$

The Cotlar–Stein lemma states that if $T_j$ are almost orthogonal, then the series $\sum_{j}T_j$ converges in the strong operator topology, and

$$\Vert \sum_{j}T_j\Vert \le\sqrt{AB}.$$

== Proof ==
If $T_1,\ldots,T_n$ is a finite collection of bounded operators, then (as will be proven below)

$$\displaystyle{\sum_{i,j} |(T_i v,T_jv)| \le \left(\max_i \sum_j \|T_i^*T_j\|^{1\over 2}\right)\left(\max_i \sum_j \|T_iT_j^*\|^{1\over 2}\right)\|v\|^2.}$$

So under the hypotheses of the lemma,

$$\displaystyle{\sum_{i,j} |(T_i v,T_jv)| \le AB\|v\|^2.}$$

It follows that

$$\displaystyle{\|\sum_{i=1}^n T_iv\|^2 \le AB \|v\|^2,}$$

and that

$$\displaystyle{\|\sum_{i=m}^n T_iv\|^2 \le \sum_{i,j\ge m} |(T_iv,T_jv)|.}$$

Hence, the partial sums

$$\displaystyle{s_n=\sum_{i=1}^n T_iv}$$

form a Cauchy sequence.

The sum is therefore absolutely convergent with the limit satisfying the stated inequality.

To prove the inequality above set

$$\displaystyle{R=\sum a_{ij}T_i^*T_j}$$

with |a_{ij}| ≤ 1 chosen so that

$$\displaystyle{(Rv,v)=|(Rv,v)|=\sum |(T_iv,T_jv)|.}$$

Then

$$\displaystyle{\|R\|^{2m} =\|(R^*R)^m\|\le \sum \|T_{i_1}^* T_{i_2} T_{i_3}^* T_{i_4} \cdots T_{i_{4m}}\| \le \sum \left(\|T_{i_1}^*\|\|T_{i_1}^*T_{i_2}\|\|T_{i_2}T_{i_3}^*\|\cdots \|T_{i_{4m-1}}^* T_{i_{4m}}\|\|T_{i_{4m}}\|\right)^{1\over 2}.}$$

Hence

$$\displaystyle{\|R\|^{2m} \le n \cdot \max \|T_i\| \left(\max_i \sum_j \|T_i^*T_j\|^{1\over 2}\right)^{2m}\left(\max_i \sum_j \|T_iT_j^*\|^{1\over 2}\right)^{2m-1}.}$$

Taking 2mth roots and letting m tend to ∞,

$$\displaystyle{\|R\|\le  \left(\max_i \sum_j \|T_i^*T_j\|^{1\over 2}\right)\left(\max_i \sum_j \|T_iT_j^*\|^{1\over 2}\right),}$$

which immediately implies the inequality.

== Generalization ==
The Cotlar-Stein lemma has been generalized, with sums being replaced by integrals. Let X be a locally compact space and μ a Borel measure on X. Let T(x) be a map from X into bounded operators from E to F which is uniformly bounded and continuous in the strong operator topology. If

$$\displaystyle{A= \sup_x \int_X \|T(x)^*T(y)\|^{1\over 2} \, d\mu(y),\,\,\, B= \sup_x \int_X \|T(y)T(x)^*\|^{1\over 2}\, d\mu(y),}$$

are finite, then the function T(x)v is integrable for each v in E with

$$\displaystyle{\|\int_X T(x)v\, d\mu(x)\| \le \sqrt{AB}  \cdot \|v\|.}$$

The result can be proven by replacing sums with integrals in the previous proof, or by utilizing Riemann sums to approximate the integrals.

== Example ==
Here is an example of an orthogonal family of operators. Consider the infinite-dimensional matrices.

$$T=\left[
\begin{array}{cccc}
1&0&0&\vdots\\0&1&0&\vdots\\0&0&1&\vdots\\\cdots&\cdots&\cdots&\ddots\end{array}
\right]$$

and also

$$\qquad
T_1=\left[
\begin{array}{cccc}
1&0&0&\vdots\\0&0&0&\vdots\\0&0&0&\vdots\\\cdots&\cdots&\cdots&\ddots\end{array}
\right],
\qquad
T_2=\left[
\begin{array}{cccc}
0&0&0&\vdots\\0&1&0&\vdots\\0&0&0&\vdots\\\cdots&\cdots&\cdots&\ddots\end{array}
\right],
\qquad
T_3=\left[
\begin{array}{cccc}
0&0&0&\vdots\\0&0&0&\vdots\\0&0&1&\vdots\\\cdots&\cdots&\cdots&\ddots\end{array}
\right],
\qquad
\dots.$$

Then $\Vert T_j\Vert=1$ for each $j$, hence the series $\sum_{j\in\mathbb{N}}T_j$ does not converge in the uniform operator topology.

Yet, since $\Vert T_j T_k^\ast\Vert=0$ and $\Vert T_j^\ast T_k\Vert=0$ for $j\ne k$, the Cotlar–Stein almost orthogonality lemma tells us that

$$T=\sum_{j\in\mathbb{N}}T_j$$

converges in the strong operator topology and is bounded by 1.
