= Swedish Modernist poetry =

Swedish modernist poetry developed in the 1910s with authors such as Pär Lagerkvist and was established the 1930s and 1940s. Distinguishing features where experimentation within a variety of styles, usually free prose without rhymes or metric syllables.

Leading modernistic poets were Artur Lundkvist (1906–1991), Gunnar Ekelöf (1907–1968), Edith Södergran (1892–1923), Karin Boye (1900–1941), Harry Martinson (1904–1978) and Erik Lindegren (1910–1968).

Gunnar Ekelöf has become described as Sweden's first surrealistic poet, after he debuted with the poetry collection sent på jorden in 1932, a work was too unconventional to become appreciated. But Ekelöf moved towards romanticism and got betters reviews for his second poetry collection Dedikation in 1934. A work that became influential for later Swedish poets was his Färjesång in 1941, a finely expressed blend of romanticism, surrealism and the dark clouds of the ongoing World War II.

Edith Södergran did not achieve fame during her lifetime, but is today regarded as one of the foremost modernistic poets from the Nordic countries, and she has been translated into all major languages. Her first poetry collection was Dikter in 1916, but it was her second collection, Septemberlyran (1918) that caught the attention of a larger audience. It is distinguished by a kind of beauty that had not been seen for a long time. Södergran suffered from tuberculosis, which took her life as early as 1923.

Harry Martinson had an unparalleled feeling of nature, in the spirit of Linnaeus. As typical for his generation, he wrote with a free prosody, not bound by rhymes and syllables. A classic work was the autobiographical Flowering Nettles, in 1935. His most remarkable work was however Aniara, 1956, a story of a spaceship drifting through space.

Artur Lundkvist played a vital role in promoting modernist poetry in Sweden. His poetry was influenced by surrealism, Walt Whitman and spanish language poets like Lorca and Pablo Neruda.

Karin Boye was one of the most important modernist poets in the 1920s and 1930s with collections like Moln (1922), Gömda land (1925), Härdarna (1927) and För trädets skull (1935).

Hjalmar Gullberg (1898–1961) wrote many mystical and Christianity influenced collections, such as Andliga övningar (Spiritual Exercises, 1932), but continued to develop and published his greatest work, Ögon, läppar (Eyes, Lips), in 1959.

In the 1940s Erik Lindegren become one of the leading modernist poets with the surreal "blown-up sonnets" of mannen utan väg (The man without a way, 1942) and the more romantic Sviter (Suites, 1947), a collection that is considered to be the highpoint of 1940s Swedish poetry.

The arguably most famous Swedish poet of the 20th century is otherwise Tomas Tranströmer (1931–2015). His poetry is distinguished by a Christian mysticism, moving on the verge between dream and reality, the physical and the metaphysical.

== Notes and references ==
- Algulin, Ingemar, A History of Swedish Literature, published by the Swedish Institute, 1989. ISBN 91-520-0239-X
- Gustafson, Alrik, A History of Swedish Literature (2 volumes), 1961.
- Lönnroth, L., Delblanc S., Göransson, S. Den svenska litteraturen (ed.), 3 volumes (1999)
- Swedish Institute, Modern Literature, accessed October 17, 2006
- Tigerstedt, E.N., Svensk litteraturhistoria (Tryckindustri AB, Solna, 1971)
