= Victor L. Shapiro =

American mathematician (1924-2013)

Victor Lenard Shapiro (16 October 1924, Chicago – 1 March 2013, Riverside, California) was an American mathematician, specializing in trigonometric series and differential equations. He is known for his two theorems (published in 1957) on the uniqueness of multiple Fourier series.

== Biography ==
In September 1944, he was awarded the Combat Infantry Badge for action on the South Pacific island of Bougainville. In April 1945, serving as a combat medic with the 132nd infantry regiment, he was in the 6th wave of a beachhead landing on Cebu and saw much action in the ensuing campaign.

From the University of Chicago, Shapiro received B.Sc. in 1947, M.Sc. in 1949, and Ph.D. in 1952, all in mathematics. His thesis advisor was Antoni Zygmund. Shapiro was from 1952 to 1960 a professor at Rutgers University and from 1960 to 1964 a professor at the University of Oregon with 3 sabbatical years (in 1953–1955 and 1958–1959) at the Institute for Advanced Study. He was a professor at the University of California, Riverside from 1964 to 2010, when he retired as professor emeritus. He was the author of several books and the author or coauthor of over 80 articles in refereed journals.

Shapiro was elected in 2003 a Fellow of the American Association for the Advancement of Science (AAAS) and in 2012 a Fellow of the American Mathematical Society (AMS). In November 1995 in Riverside, California, a conference was held in his honor.

Upon his death he was survived by his widow, 4 children, and 13 grandchildren.

== Selected publications ==
=== Articles ===
- Shapiro, Victor L. (1954). "Circular summability $C$ of double trigonometric series". Transactions of the American Mathematical Society. 76 (2): 223–233. doi:10.2307/1990766. JSTOR 1990766.
- Shapiro, Victor L. (1964). "Fourier series in several variables". Bulletin of the American Mathematical Society. 70 (1): 48–93. doi:10.1090/S0002-9904-1964-11026-0.
- Shapiro, Victor L. (1974). "Isolated singularities for solutions of the nonlinear stationary Navier-Stokes equations". Trans. Amer. Math. Soc. 187: 335–363. doi:10.1090/S0002-9947-1974-0380158-2.
- Shapiro, Victor L. (1976). "Generalized and classical solutions of the nonlinear stationary Navier-Stokes equations". Trans. Amer. Math. Soc. 216: 61–79. doi:10.1090/S0002-9947-1976-0390550-X.
- Shapiro, Victor L. (1986). "Resonance and quasilinear ellipticity". Trans. Amer. Math. Soc. 294 (2): 567–584. doi:10.1090/S0002-9947-1986-0825722-7.
- Shapiro, Victor L. (1991). "Resonance and the second BVP". Trans. Amer. Math. Soc. 325: 363–387. doi:10.1090/S0002-9947-1991-0994172-7.
- Shapiro, Victor L. (2001). "Quasilinearity below the 1st eigenvalue". Proc. Amer. Math. Soc. 129 (7): 1955–1962. doi:10.1090/S0002-9939-01-06124-X.
- Shapiro, Victor L. (2003). "Fractals and distributions on the $N$-torus". Proc. Amer. Math. Soc. 131 (11): 3431–3440. doi:10.1090/S0002-9939-03-06929-6.
- Shapiro, Victor L. (2006). "Poisson integrals and non tangential limits". Proc. Amer. Math. Soc. 134 (11): 3181–3189. doi:10.1090/S0002-9939-06-08331-6.

=== Books ===
- Shapiro, Victor L. (1961). Topics in Fourier and geometric analysis. Memoirs of the AMS, Number 39. ISBN 9780821812396.
- Shapiro, Victor Lenard (2001). Singularity quasilinearity and higher eigenvalues. Memoirs of the AMS, Vol. 153, Number 726. ISBN 9780821827178.
- Fourier series in several variables with applications to partial differential equations. CRC Press. 2011. ISBN 9781439854280.
