= Guido Weiss =

American mathematician (1928–2021)

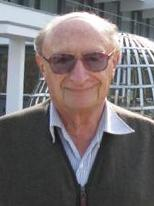
- Guido Weiss c. 2011
- Born: 29 December 1928; Trieste, Italy
- Died: 25 December 2021 (aged 92); St. Louis, Missouri, U.S.
- Education: University of Chicago (BS, MS, PhD)
- Spouse: Barbara Weiss
- Children: 2
- Awards: Chauvenet Prize (1967)
- Scientific career
- Workplaces: DePaul University; Institut Henri Poincaré; Washington University in St. Louis
- Thesis: On certain classes of function spaces and on the interpolation of sublinear operators (1956)
- Doctoral advisor: Antoni Zygmund

Guido Leopold Weiss (29 December 1928–25 December 2021 in St. Louis) was an American mathematician, working in analysis, especially Fourier analysis and harmonic analysis.

== Childhood ==
Weiss was born in Trieste Italy into a Jewish family. His parents, Edoardo and Vonda Weiss, were both psychiatrists. Weiss was forced out of school at the age of 9, upon the passage of Italy's Italian Racial Laws, which forbade all Jewish children from attending public school. He attended a Jewish school in Rome until the end of 1939 when his father was sponsored by members of the Menninger family to emigrate to America. The family settled in Topeka, Kansas.

== Career ==
Weiss studied at the University of Chicago, where he received in 1951 his master's degree and in 1956 under Antoni Zygmund his PhD with thesis On certain classes of function spaces and on the interpolation of sublinear operators. At DePaul University he became an instructor in 1955, an assistant professor in 1956, and in 1959 an associate professor. in 1960 he was a visiting professor in Buenos Aires and in the same year a postdoc at the Institut Henri Poincaré in Paris. In 1961 Weiss became an associate professor and in 1963 a professor at Washington University in St. Louis, where from 1967 to 1970 he was also chair of the mathematics department. He was a visiting professor at several universities, including the University of Geneva (1964–65), the Université Paris-Sud (1970–71), the Scuola Normale Superiore in Pisa (1980), in Madrid and in Beijing. In the academic year 1987–88 he was at MSRI as the organizer of a program in classical analysis.

In 1967 Weiss won the Chauvenet Prize for his article Harmonic Analysis. In 1994 he was given honorary doctorates in Milan and Barcelona. In 2012 he became a fellow of the American Mathematical Society.

== Works ==
- Harmonic Analysis. In: Studies in Real and Complex Analysis, edited by I. I. Hirschman. MAA Studies in Mathematics, Vol. 3, Mathematical Association of America, Washington, DC, 1965, pp. 124–178.
- with Elias Stein: Introduction to Fourier Analysis on Euclidean spaces. Princeton University Press 1971.
- with Ronald Coifman: Analyse harmonique non-commutative sur certains espaces homogènes. É́tude de certaines intégrales singulières. Springer-Verlag 1971. 2006 pbk edition
- with Ronald Coifman: Transference methods in analysis. AMS 1977.
- with Eugenio Hernandez: A first course on Wavelets. Boca Raton, CRC Press 1996.
- with Michael Frazier, Björn Jawerth: Littlewood–Paley theory and the study of function spaces. AMS 1991.
- with William Boothby (eds.): Symmetric spaces. Dekker 1972.
