= Antoni Zygmund =

Polish-American mathematician (1900–1992)

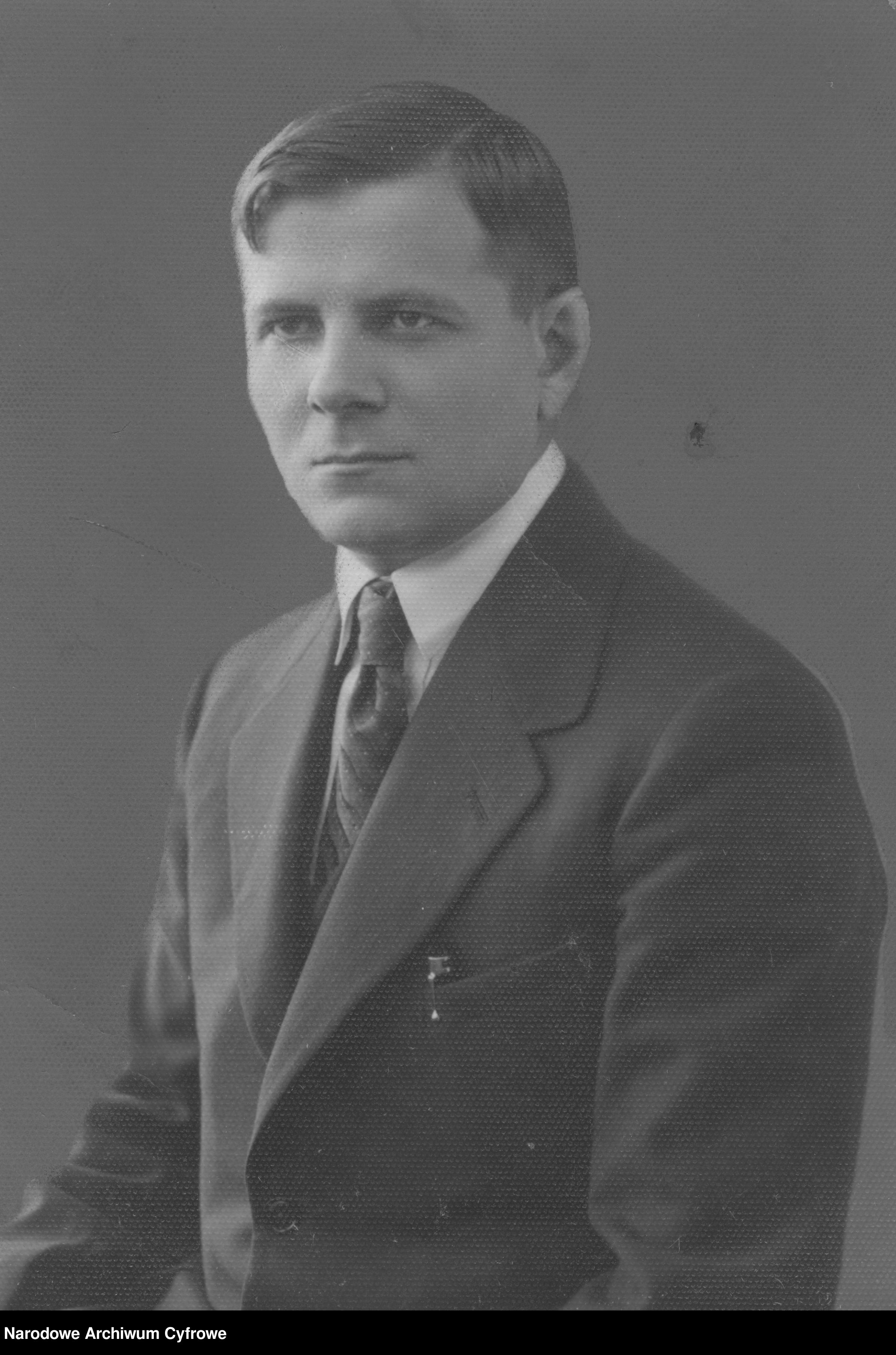
- Zygmund, ca. 1935
- Born: December 26, 1900; Warsaw, Congress Poland, Russian Empire
- Died: May 30, 1992 (aged 91); Chicago, Illinois, United States
- Citizenship: Polish, American
- Education: University of Warsaw (Ph.D., 1923)
- Known for: Singular integral operators Calderón–Zygmund lemma Marcinkiewicz–Zygmund inequality Paley–Zygmund inequality Calderón–Zygmund kernel Chicago school of mathematical analysis
- Awards: Leroy P. Steele Prize (1979); National Medal of Science (1986)
- Scientific career
- Fields: Mathematics
- Workplaces: University of Chicago; Stefan Batory University
- Doctoral advisor: Aleksander Rajchman; Stefan Mazurkiewicz
- Doctoral students: Alberto Calderón; Paul Cohen; Mischa Cotlar; Nathan Fine; Józef Marcinkiewicz; Benjamin Muckenhoupt; Stylianos Pichorides; Victor L. Shapiro; Elias M. Stein; Guido Weiss

Antoni Szczepan Zygmund (Polish pronunciation: [anˈtɔɲi ˈzɘgmunt]; 26 December 1900 – 30 May 1992) was a Polish-American mathematician. He worked mostly in the area of mathematical analysis, including harmonic analysis, and he is considered one of the greatest analysts of the 20th century. Zygmund was responsible for creating the Chicago school of mathematical analysis together with his doctoral student Alberto Calderón, for which he was awarded the National Medal of Science, the highest American science award, in 1986.

== Life and career ==
Zygmund was born on 26 December 1900 in Warsaw, then part of the Russian Empire, in a Polish family of Wincenty Zygmund and Antonina (née Perowska). He was the oldest of four siblings, with three younger sisters. In 1914, his secondary education in Warsaw was interrupted by the outbreak of World War I forcing his family to relocate to Poltava (present-day Ukraine). In 1918, he returned to Poland, which had just become an independent state, and spent a year studying at Kazimierz Kulwiee’s Gymnasium in Warsaw.

The following year, he enrolled at the University of Warsaw and studied under prominent mathematicians representing the Warsaw School of Mathematics including Zygmunt Janiszewski, Stefan Mazurkiewicz and Wacław Sierpiński. In 1920, Zygmund’s education was interrupted again when he was drafted into the army. He did not take part in active combat in the Polish–Soviet War and was therefore able to resume his academic work. During his time at the University of Warsaw, Zygmund was particularly influenced by Aleksander Rajchman, attending his lectures and a seminar on the theory of trigonometric series. In 1923, Zygmund obtained his doctorate from the University of Warsaw based on his thesis concerning the Riemannian theory of trigonometric series written under the formal supervision of Mazurkiewicz.

In 1922–26, Zygmund worked as an assistant at the Warsaw University of Technology. In 1926, he earned his habilitation and assumed the position of a docent at the University of Warsaw. In 1929, he was granted a Rockefeller Foundation scholarship and spent a year in Oxford and Cambridge, which exerted a profound impact upon his scientific development. He collaborated with such mathematicians as Raymond Paley, G.H. Hardy and J. E. Littlewood, publishing five joint-papers with Paley between 1930 and 1931.

In 1935, Zygmund published in Polish the original edition of what has become, in its English translation, the two-volume Trigonometric Series. It was described by Robert A. Fefferman as "one of the most influential books in the history of mathematical analysis" and "an extraordinarily comprehensive and masterful presentation of a ... vast field". Jean-Pierre Kahane called the book "The Bible" of a harmonic analyst. In 1988, a new edition of the work was published by Cambridge University Press. The theory of trigonometric series had remained the largest component of Zygmund's mathematical investigations.

Zygmund also worked with Stanisław Saks, with whom he co-authored the book Analytic Functions published in the Monografie Matematyczne (Mathematical Monographs) series in 1938.

Zygmund was a professor at Stefan Batory University in Wilno from 1930 to 1939. During this period, he began a highly productive scientific collaboration with his most gifted student, Józef Marcinkiewicz, with whom he also developed a close personal friendship. Together they obtained significant results in real and Fourier analysis, probability theory, and moment inequalities, contributions that later became foundational in several areas of modern mathematical analysis. Zygmund also further developed many of Marcinkiewicz's ideas after his student's tragic death and played an important role in helping preserve his scientific legacy abroad.

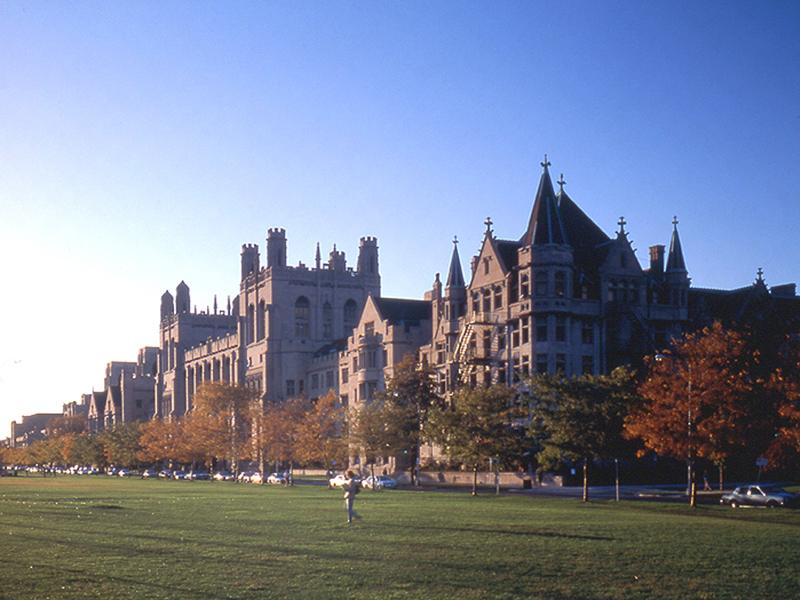
Zygmund spent most of his academic career at the University of Chicago

When World War II broke out, Poland was occupied and, in 1940, Zygmund managed to emigrate to the United States. Thanks to the support from Jerzy Neyman, Jacob Tamarkin and Norbert Wiener, he received an invitation to Mount Holyoke College in South Hadley, Massachusetts where he became a professor. In 1945–1947, he was a professor at the University of Pennsylvania, and from 1947, until his retirement, at the University of Chicago. During his time in Chicago, Zygmund together with his student Alberto Calderon (whom he had met in 1948 in Argentina), founded the Chicago school of mathematical analysis, a school of thought in mathematics that highlights the use of Fourier analysis in the study of partial differential equations. It became one of the most influential analytical schools of the 20th century, contributing many of the field’s major advances.

He was a member of several scientific societies. From 1930 until 1952 he was a member of the Warsaw Scientific Society (TNW), from 1946 of the Polish Academy of Learning (PAU), from 1959 of the Polish Academy of Sciences (PAN), and from 1961 of the National Academy of Sciences in the United States.

In 1954, Zygmund participated as an invited speaker at the International Congress of Mathematicians in Amsterdam.

In 1979, Zygmund was awarded the Leroy P. Steele Prize from the American Mathematical Society for "his cumulative influence on the theory of Fourier series, real variables, and related areas of analysis."

In 1986, Zygmund received the National Medal of Science, the highest science award in the United States, from President Ronald Reagan for his outstanding contribution to the development of Fourier analysis, as well as its application to partial differential equations and other branches of mathematical analysis. He was also recognized for his "creation and leadership of the strongest school of analytical research in the contemporary mathematical world."

In 1981, he was granted emeritus status. Zygmund continued attending analysis seminars at Chicago even in his eighties, contributing profound and incisive insights. He died on 30 May 1992 in Chicago, at the age of 91.

Zygmund published six books and more than 180 scientific papers during his career. He was the advisor of 40 doctoral students, including Alberto Calderón, Paul Cohen (Fields Medal winner), Nathan Fine, Józef Marcinkiewicz, Victor L. Shapiro, Guido Weiss, Elias M. Stein and Mischa Cotlar.

== Contributions ==
His work has had a pervasive influence in many fields of mathematics, mostly in mathematical analysis, and particularly in harmonic analysis. Among his chief interests in that area was expressing vibrating bodies in precise mathematical terms, a key issue in spacecraft engineering, crystallography, and laser holography.

Some of his most important contributions concerned the theory of singular integral operators, and were achieved in collaboration with Calderón. In particular, the Calderón–Zygmund lemma is regarded as a fundamental result in this area of mathematics. It was developed to prove the weak-type continuity of singular integrals of integrable functions becoming a standard tool in analysis and probability theory. George G. Lorentz called it Zygmund's crowning achievement, one that "stands somewhat apart from the rest of Zygmund's work".

Zygmund, together with Raphaël Salem, demonstrated that a Cantor-like set with dissection ratio ξ is a set of uniqueness if and only if 1/ξ is a Pisot number, that is an algebraic integer characterized by the fact that all its conjugates (if any) are smaller than 1. Their result was the first to show that the uniqueness property depends on arithmetic features rather than merely on notions of size.

The Marcinkiewicz–Zygmund inequality is another significant result by Zygmund. It establishes relationships between the moments of independent random variables and constitutes a generalization of the rule for the sum of variances of independent random variables to moments of arbitrary order.

Other concepts named after Zygmund include the Paley–Zygmund inequality, Calderón–Zygmund kernel, Calderón–Zygmund decomposition and Calderón–Zygmund operators.

== Family ==
Antoni Zygmund, who had three sisters, married Irena Parnowska, a mathematician, in 1925. Upon his death he was survived by four grandsons.

== Awards and recognition ==
Zygmund received a number of awards and distinctions, some of which include:

- 1953: Guggenheim Fellowship
- 1954: Invited Speaker at the International Congress of Mathematicians
- 1959: Member of the Polish Academy of Sciences
- 1961: Member of the National Academy of Sciences
- 1964: Member of the National Academy of Sciences of Argentina
- 1967: Member of the Spanish Royal Academy of Sciences, the American Academy of Arts and Sciences, and the London Mathematical Society
- 1972: Jurzykowski Foundation Prize, member of the Polish Mathematical Society
- 1975: Sierpiński Medal, conferred jointly by the Polish Mathematical Society and the University of Warsaw
- 1979: Leroy P. Steele Prize
- 1986: National Medal of Science

He accepted honorary doctorates from Mount Holyoke College, Washington University in St. Louis, the Nicolaus Copernicus University in Toruń, the University of Paris, and the University of Uppsala.

== Books ==
- Trigonometric Series (Cambridge University Press 1959, 2002)
- Intégrales singulières (Springer-Verlag, 1971)
- Trigonometric Interpolation (University of Chicago, 1950)
- Measure and Integral: An Introduction to Real Analysis, with Richard L. Wheeden (Marcel Dekker, 1977)
- Analytic Functions, with Stanislaw Saks (Elsevier Science Ltd, 1971)

== See also ==
- Zygmunt Janiszewski
- List of Polish mathematicians
- Centipede mathematics
