= Rajchman measure =

In mathematics, a Rajchman measure, studied by Rajchman (1928), is a regular Borel measure on a locally compact group such as the circle, whose Fourier transform vanishes at infinity.
