= Instituto Argentino de Matemática =

Research center of CONICET

Coordinates: 34.6102°S 58.4034°W

Based in Buenos Aires, the Instituto Argentino de Matemática (I. A. M.) is a research center of the National Research Council of Argentina (CONICET). It is named after Alberto Pedro Calderón in honor of one of its former directors, the Argentinian mathematician widely recognized as a towering figure of 20th-century mathematics. The overarching goal of the institute is to promote the development of pure and applied mathematics research in Argentina.
