= Marcinkiewicz–Zygmund inequality =

Mathematical theorem

In mathematics, the Marcinkiewicz–Zygmund inequality, named after Józef Marcinkiewicz and Antoni Zygmund, gives relations between moments of a collection of independent random variables. It is a generalization of the rule for the sum of variances of independent random variables to moments of arbitrary order. It is a special case of the Burkholder-Davis-Gundy inequality in the case of discrete-time martingales.

== Statement of the inequality ==
Theorem If $\textstyle X_{i}$, $\textstyle i=1,\ldots,n$, are independent random variables such that $\textstyle E\left( X_{i}\right) =0$ and $\textstyle E\left( \left\vert X_{i}\right\vert ^{p}\right) <+\infty$, $\textstyle 1\leq p<+\infty$, then

$$A_{p}E\left(  \left(  \sum_{i=1}^{n}\left\vert X_{i}\right\vert ^{2}\right) _{{}}^{p/2}\right)  \leq E\left(  \left\vert \sum_{i=1}^{n}X_{i}\right\vert ^{p}\right)  \leq B_{p}E\left(  \left(  \sum_{i=1}^{n}\left\vert X_{i}\right\vert ^{2}\right)  _{{}}^{p/2}\right)$$

where $\textstyle A_{p}$ and $\textstyle B_{p}$ are positive constants, which depend only on $\textstyle p$ and not on the underlying distribution of the random variables involved.

== The second-order case ==
In the case $\textstyle p=2$, the inequality holds with $\textstyle A_{2}=B_{2}=1$, and it reduces to the rule for the sum of variances of independent random variables with zero mean, known from elementary statistics: If $\textstyle E\left( X_{i}\right) =0$ and $\textstyle E\left( \left\vert X_{i}\right\vert ^{2}\right) <+\infty$, then

$$\mathrm{Var}\left(\sum_{i=1}^{n}X_{i}\right)=E\left(  \left\vert \sum_{i=1}^{n}X_{i}\right\vert ^{2}\right)  =\sum_{i=1}^{n}\sum_{j=1}^{n}E\left( X_{i}\overline{X}_{j}\right)  =\sum_{i=1}^{n}E\left(  \left\vert X_{i}\right\vert ^{2}\right)  =\sum_{i=1}^{n}\mathrm{Var}\left(X_{i}\right).$$

== See also ==
Several similar moment inequalities are known as Khintchine inequality and Rosenthal inequalities, and there are also extensions to more general symmetric statistics of independent random variables.
