= Chicago school (mathematical analysis) =

The Chicago school of mathematical analysis is a school of thought in mathematics that emphasizes the applications of Fourier analysis to the study of partial differential equations. Mathematician Antoni Zygmund co-founded the school with his doctoral student Alberto Calderón at the University of Chicago in the 1950s. Over the years, Zygmund mentored over 40 doctoral students at the University of Chicago.

== Key people ==
- Antoni Zygmund
- Alberto Calderón
- Paul Cohen, Fields Medal winner (1966)
- Charles Fefferman, Fields Medal winner (1978)
- Eli Stein

== Comments ==
The Chicago school of analysis is considered to be one of the strongest schools of mathematical analysis in the 20th century, which was responsible for some of the most important developments in analysis.

== Awards ==
In 1986, Antoni Zygmund received the National Medal of Science, in part for his "creation and leadership of the strongest school of analytical research in the contemporary mathematical world."

== See also ==
- Joseph Fourier
- Mathematical analysis
