= Maria Wine =

Swedish-Danish poet and writer

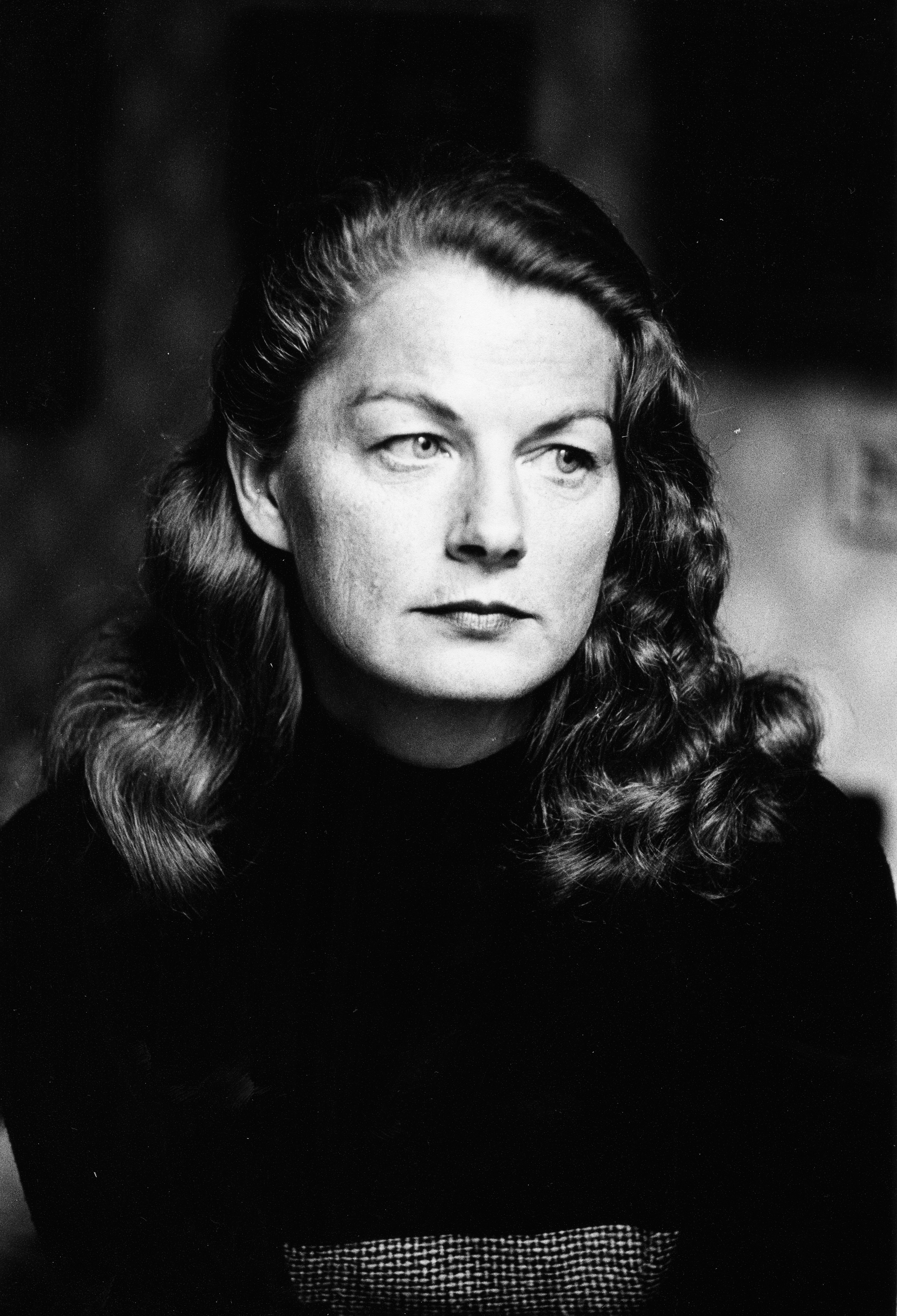
Maria Wine, 1950.

Maria Wine (July 8, 1912 – April 22, 2003) was a Swedish-Danish poet and writer.

== Biography ==
Wine was born in Copenhagen and grew up in an orphanage there. In 1936, she met Swedish writer Artur Lundkvist, whom she married the same year. The two settled in Stockholm, and remained together until Lundkvist's death in 1991.

Her first collection of poetry, Vinden ur mörkret ('The Wind Out of the Darkness', 1943), was heavily influenced by modernism. With Feberfötter ('Fever Feet', 1947), her writing gradually became more personal and deeply painful. In Man har skjutit ett lejon ('They Have Shot a Lion', 1951), Wine recounts the years she spent at the orphanage, and in Munspel under molnen ('Harmonica Under the Clouds', 1956), her travels to different parts of the world are recounted.

Until her death in 2003, Wine published more than thirty collections of prose and poetry. She received several awards, such as the Bellman Prize (1976) and the Ferlin Prize (1985).
