= Józef Marcinkiewicz =

Polish mathematician (1910–1940)

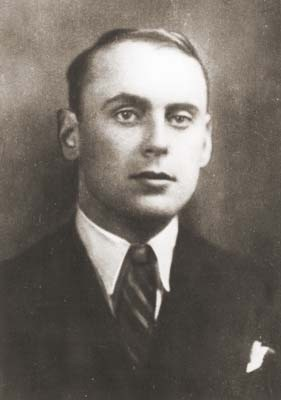
- Marcinkiewicz ca.1939
- Born: 30 March 1910; Cimoszka, Congress Poland, Russian Empire
- Died: 1940 (aged 29–30); Kharkiv, USSR (now Ukraine)
- Citizenship: Polish
- Education: Vilnius University
- Known for: Marcinkiewicz multiplier theorem Marcinkiewicz interpolation theorem Marcinkiewicz–Zygmund inequality
- Awards: Piłsudski Prize (1937)
- Scientific career
- Fields: Mathematics
- Workplaces: Vilnius University; University of Lviv
- Thesis: Trigonometric interpolation of absolutely continuous functions (1935)
- Doctoral advisor: Antoni Zygmund

Józef Marcinkiewicz (Polish pronunciation: [ˈjuzɛf mart͡ɕinˈkʲjɛvit͡ʂ]; 30 March 1910 in Cimoszka, near Białystok, Poland – 1940 in Kharkiv, USSR) was a Polish mathematician who worked at the Stefan Batory University in Vilnius. He is considered one of the most prominent Polish mathematicians of the Interwar period. Despite his short career, he made substantial contributions to real analysis, Fourier analysis, interpolation theory, orthogonal series, complex analysis, and probability theory.

Concepts named after Marcinkiewicz include the Marcinkiewicz multiplier theorem, Marcinkiewicz interpolation theorem, and Marcinkiewicz–Zygmund inequality. Following the outbreak of World War II, Marcinkiewicz enlisted in the Polish Army and, in 1940, he fell victim to the Soviet-perpetrated Katyn massacre.

== Life and career ==
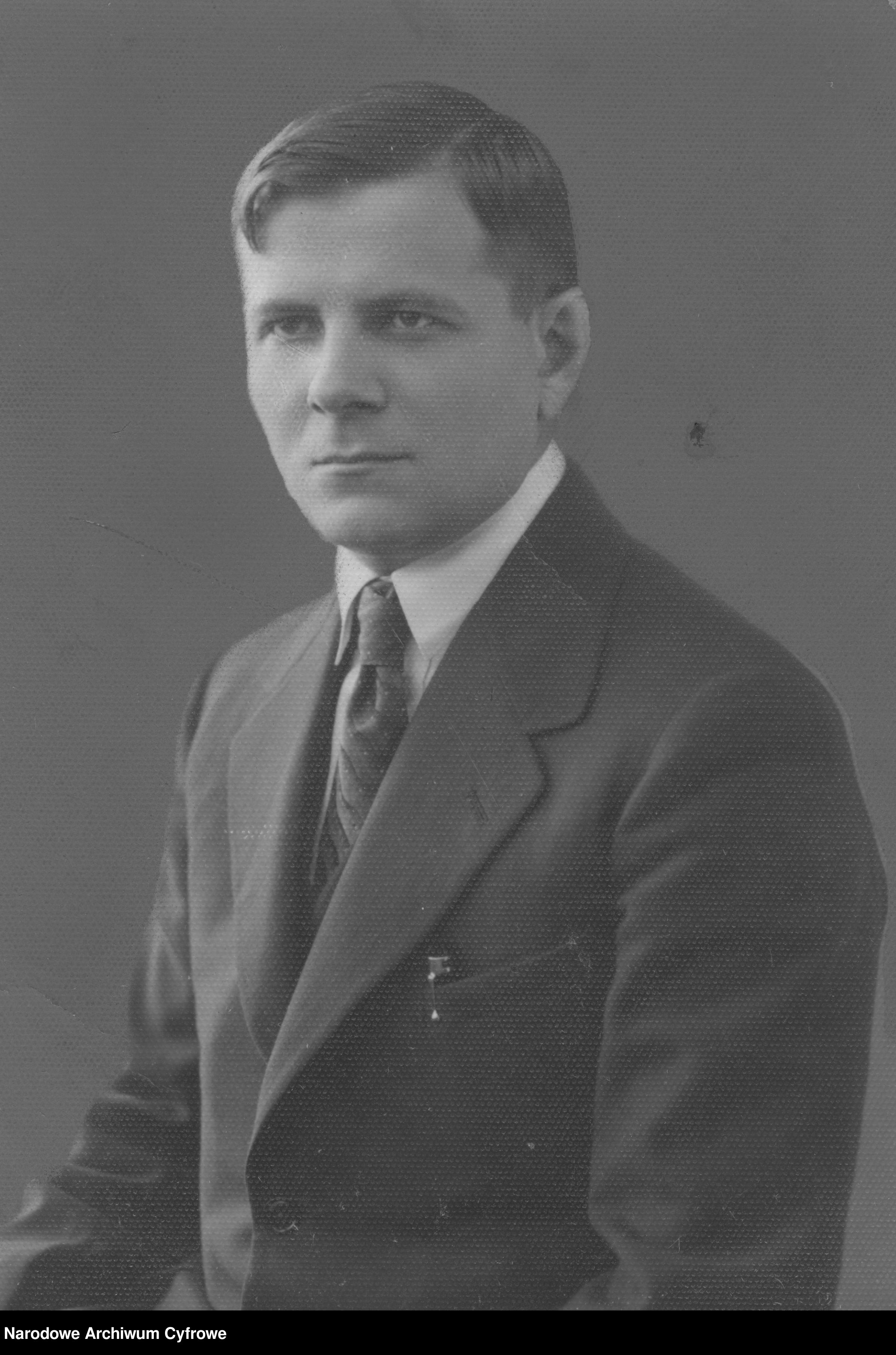
Antoni Zygmund strongly shaped Marcinkiewicz’s early mathematical development.

Marcinkiewicz was born on 30 March 1910 in the small settlement of Cimoszka, then part of Congress Poland, 35 km north-west of Białystok, to Klemens and Aleksandra (née Chodakiewicz). He was one of five children, with one sister and three brothers. His family was of fairly comfortable means. Marcinkiewicz received patriotic upbringing and attended a gymnasium in Sokółka. He later transferred to King Sigismund Augustus State Gymnasium in Białystok, where he passed his Matura exam. Despite fragile health as a child, he was able to practice sports including swimming and skiing. His early education inspired him to develop a keen interest in mathematics and Polish literature.

In 1930, Marcinkiewicz enrolled at the Stefan Batory University in Wilno (now Vilnius, Lithuania) and studied in the Department of Mathematical and Natural Sciences. His abilities were immediately noticed by his professors who considered him a standout talent in mathematics. During his time at the university, Marcinkiewicz conducted research on trigonometric series and Lebesgue integration. He began his close scientific collaboration and friendship with his professor Antoni Zygmund as a second-year student, which was seen as extraordinary. Zygmund observed that Marcinkiewicz's mathematical growth was "progressing at a very fast rate, and the richness and originality of new ideas in him was always a source of amazement" to him.

He was also a very active student who participated in the Mathematics and Physics Club, becoming its president in 1932. In 1933, he graduated from the university. Two years later, Marcinkiewicz obtained his doctorate based on his thesis entitled Trigonometric interpolation of absolutely continuous functions written under the supervision of Zygmund.

In 1935, he was awarded a Fund for National Culture scholarship, which made it possible for him to visit Lwów and work as an assistant at the Jan Kazimierz University (now University of Lviv), where he personally met Stefan Banach and Hugo Steinhaus, leading representatives of the Lwów School of Mathematics. During this period, he worked with Juliusz Schauder, Władysław Orlicz and Stefan Kaczmarz. His collaboration with the latter led to a series of publications on the topic of general orthogonal systems including Sur les multiplicateurs des séries orthogonales (1938).

Marcinkiewicz visited the Scottish Café, a meeting place for renowned Leopolitan mathematicians, solving two problems and contributing one to the famous Scottish Book. Upon returning to Wilno, he was appointed a senior assistant and subsequently, in 1937, a docent, becoming the youngest person to hold this position at the university. The same year, he received the Józef Piłsudski Scientific Prize for his contributions to mathematics, and was awarded his habilitation on the basis of his work O sumowalności szeregów ortogonalnych (On the Summability of Orthogonal Series) published in Wiadomości matematyczne (Mathematical News) the following year.

Alongside his academic career, Marcinkiewicz pursued a military one as well. In 1934, he completed the divisional reserve infantry officer cadet course. In 1935, 1936/1937 and again in 1938, he underwent training with the 1st Legions Infantry Regiment in Vilnius, serving as a platoon commander. In 1937, he reached the rank of second lieutenant.

At the age of just 29, Marcinkiewicz received an offer of Chair of Mathematics at the Poznań University, with the position of extraordinary professor, which he accepted and was to have started teaching there in the 1939/1940 academic year. In the meantime, encouraged by his fruitful time in Lwów, he decided to submit another application for a scholarship from the National Culture Fund, which proved successful. In 1939, Marcinkiewicz travelled to Paris, where he conducted research with Stefan Bergman, and Raphaël Salem, and to London, where he spent five months at the University College London. While in London, as the political climate rapidly worsened, he resolved to return to his homeland despite efforts by his colleagues to convince him to stay. Years of military training and a sense of patriotic obligation motivated Marcinkiewicz to make this decision.

== World War II and death ==
He enlisted in the Polish Army during the German invasion of Poland. In the aftermath of the simultaneous Soviet invasion of Poland, Marcinkiewicz was taken as a Polish POW to a Soviet camp in Starobielsk. The exact place and date of his death remain unknown, but it is believed that he died, when aged 30, murdered by the NKVD in Kharkiv between 5 April and 12 May 1940. His parents, to whom he gave his manuscripts before the beginning of World War II, were transported to the Soviet Union in 1940 and later died of hunger in a camp.

Zygmund recounts the fate of Marcinkiewicz and his parents, writing about the last time he saw him and about Marcinkiewicz’s lost mathematical works as follows:

On 2 September, the second day of the war, I came across him accidentally in the street in Wilno, already in military uniform ... We agreed to meet the same day in the evening but apparently circumstances prevented him from coming since he did not show up at the appointed place. A few months later came the news that he was a prisoner of war and was asking for mathematical books. It seems that this was the last news about Marcinkiewicz. During his time in Paris and England, Marcinkiewicz had produced some mathematical work which he had written down in manuscript form. After returning to Poland he gave these manuscripts to his parents for safe keeping. Sadly Marcinkiewicz's parents suffered the same fate as he did and died during the war. No trace of the manuscripts was ever found.

He has a symbolic grave located in Janów, north-eastern Poland.

== Work ==
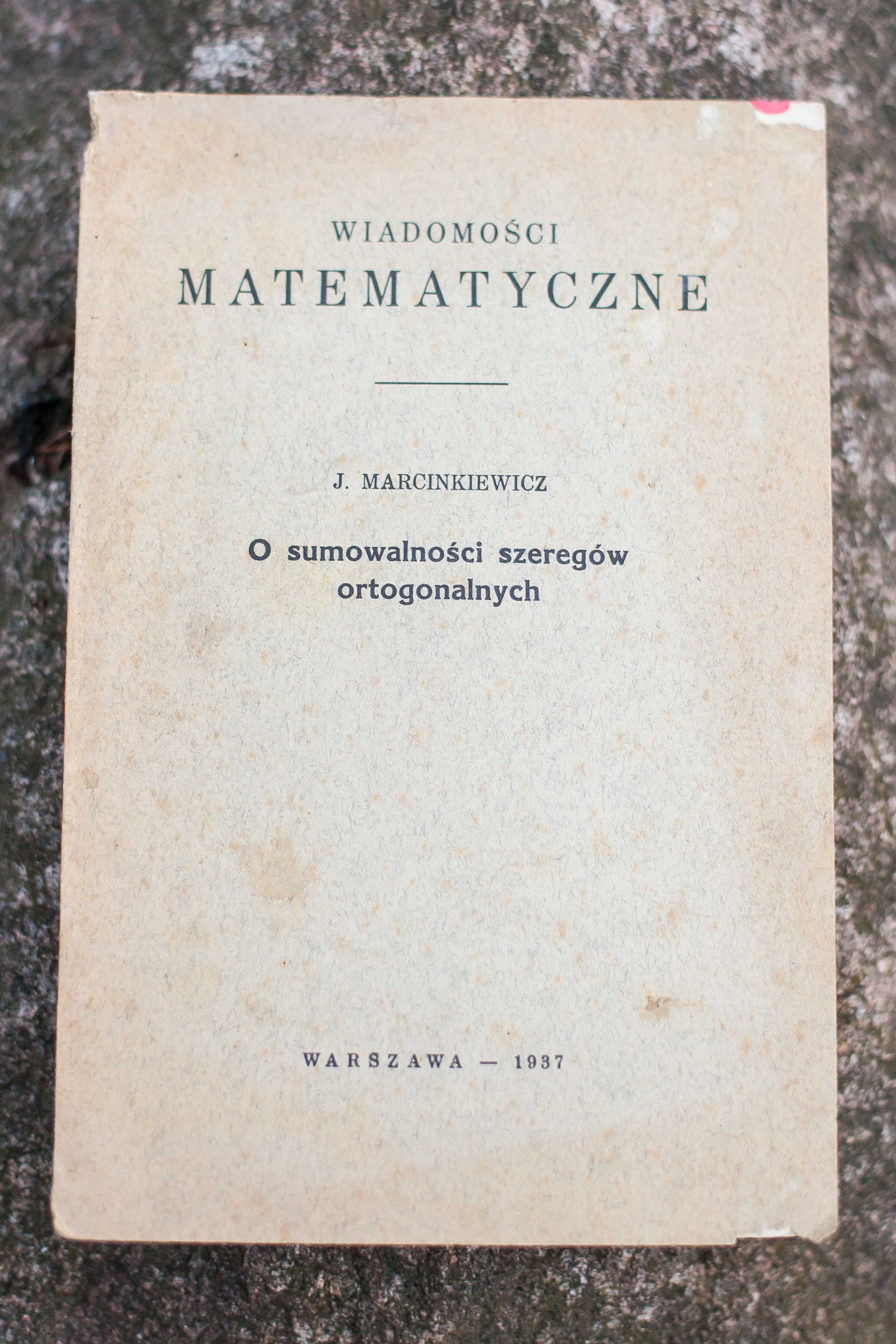
On the Summability of Orthogonal Series by Marcinkiewicz (1937)

Despite a very short period of scientific activity lasting six years, Marcinkiewicz published 50 works by 1939 (roughly one paper every two months) in such areas as real analysis, trigonometric series, the interpolation of functions by trigonometric polynomials, orthogonal series, complex analysis, and probability theory. He obtained many important and original results, as reflected in the concepts that bear his name.

The Marcinkiewicz multiplier theorem is a result in harmonic analysis in the theory of Fourier multipliers. The Marcinkiewicz interpolation theorem is a result in functional analysis bounding the norms of non-linear operators acting on L^{p} spaces while the Marcinkiewicz–Zygmund inequality gives relations between moments of a collection of independent random variables. The Marcinkiewicz integral proved an especially useful tool in helping better understand and develop the theory of the Hilbert transform. In 1939, he introduced the concept of the Marcinkiewicz space. Together with Stefan Bergman, he studied the complex functions, which culminated in the publication of their joint work Sur les valeurs limites des fonctions de deux variables complexes (1939).

== Personal life ==
Marcinkiewicz was known for his sense of humour and a very active social life. At the university, he was seen as an eccentric endowed with great mathematical intuition. He was engaged to Irena Sławińska, who was a historian and theoretician of literature. He was passionate about learning foreign languages and was fluent in English, French and Italian.

== Remembrance ==
On 5 October 2007, Minister of National Defence, Aleksander Szczygło, posthumously promoted Marcinkiewicz to the rank of captain. Since 1957, the Polish Mathematical Society's branch in Toruń has organized the annual Józef Marcinkiewicz Competition for the best university students' work in mathematics.

In 2011, a street in Białystok was named after Marcinkiewicz in recognition of his achievements and his connection to the region.

In 2021, the Polish Institute of National Remembrance produced a documentary film entitled Wybranice bogów (Gods' Chosen One) devoted to the life and legacy of Marcinkiewicz. It was directed by Konrad Starczewski, Tomasz Matuszczak and Rafał Pękała, and had its premiere at the 13th edition of the NNW Film Festival in Gdynia.

In 2023, a mural in memory of Marcinkiewicz was unveiled at a high school in Sokółka.

In 2024, a memorial room in honour of Marcinkiewicz was officially opened by local authorities at the ZSCKR High School in Janów, which also bears his name as its patron.

== See also ==
- Polish Mathematical Society
- List of Polish mathematicians
- Riesz–Thorin theorem
- Multiplier (Fourier analysis)

== Bibliography ==
- Dabrowski, Kazimierz; Hensz-Chadzyńska, Ewa (2002), "Józef Marcinkiewicz (1910–1940). In commemoration of the 60th anniversary of his death" (PDF), in Żelazko, Wiesław (ed.), Fourier analysis and related topics (Będlewo, 2000), Banach Center Publications, vol. 56, Warsaw: Polish Academy of Sciences, Institute of Mathematics, pp. 31–35, MR 1971561, Zbl 1026.01018.
- Zygmund, Antoni (1964), "Józef Marcinkiewicz", in Marcinkiewicz, Józef (ed.), Collected papers, Instytut Matematyczny Polskiej Akademii Nauk, Warsaw: Państwowe Wydawnictwo Naukowe, pp. 1–31, MR 0168434, Zbl 0124.24103.

== Notes ==
- Marcinkiewicz, Józef (1964), Zygmund, Antoni; Lojasiewicz, Stanislaw; Musielak, Julian; Urbanik, Kazimierz; Wiweger, Antoni (eds.), Collected papers, Instytut Matematyczny Polskiej Akademii Nauk, Warsaw: Państwowe Wydawnictwo Naukowe, pp. VIII+673, MR 0168434, Zbl 0124.24103.
