= Zygmunt Świechowski =

Polish art historian and conservator (1920-2015)

Zygmunt Świechowski (18 February 1920 – 28 December 2015) was a Lithuanian-born Polish art historian and architectural conservator with a particular interest in the Romanesque era. Świechowski was also a leading figure in architectural preservation and restoration work in Poland, and he used photography extensively to illustrate his books as well as in a number of public exhibitions. His best-known work is Romanesque Art in Poland, with 28 editions published between 1982 and 1990 in six languages.

== Education ==
Świechowski was born in Vilnius, Lithuania on 18 February 1920. He began his schooling in Panevėžys, Lithuania and moved on to secondary schooling in Rydzyn, Poland. Already keenly interested in history and preservation as a teenager, he documented roadside shrines and Lithuanian wooden crosses placed in village homesteads around Samogitia, which in the 1930s were disappearing as a result of land enclosures. Delayed by World War II, he began studies in art history at Adam Mickiewicz University, Poznań in 1945. He gained his Master's degree in 1948 for his thesis Granite Architecture of Western Pomerania, and in 1950 successfully defended his doctoral dissertation, titled Opactwo cysterskie w Sulejowie (The Cistercian Abbey in Sulejów).

== Career ==
While still at university, Świechowski worked as an assistant in the graphic arts department at the Greater Poland Museum (Muzeum Wielkopolskiego) in Poznań from 1945 to 1947. From 1947 to 1948 he was an assistant in the Department of Art History at Adam Mickiewicz University and in 1949 became an assistant in the Institute of Polish Architecture at the Warsaw University of Technology. In 1955 he was promoted to assistant professor and was made head of monument and site preservation at the Institute of Polish Architecture at the Warsaw University of Technology. He moved to become head of the department of Art History at the University of Wrocław in 1963, remaining there until 1978. He gained the title of associate professor in 1967. He became head of the Institute of Architecture and Urban Planning at the Technical University of Łódz in 1979, a post he held until his retirement from academia in 1990, having been made full professor of arts in 1986.

In addition to his academic roles, Świechowski was from 1951 until 1963 director of the department of studies and documentation at the State Enterprise Workshops for the Preservation of Monuments. A catalog, Budownictwo romańskie w Polsce (Romanesque Buildings in Poland) published in 1963, was influential in the development of further relevant research and preservation programmes. In 1978 he became head of Research and Preservation on the Management Board of PP PKZ, the leading body responsible for the physical conservation and restoration of historic buildings and monuments in Poland.

== Travels ==
In 1956 Świechowski was granted a scholarship by the Centre d'études supérieures de civilisation médiévale in Poitiers, which enabled him to undertake a year-long trip to France and Italy. This trip fuelled an interest in Western Romanesque art and architecture, and resulted in the publication in 1973 of Sculpture romane d’Auvergne; And subsequently with Alberto Rizzi he published Romanische Reliefs von venezianischen Fassaden – Patere e Formelle with photographs of more than a thousand little-known Venetian architectural sculptures from the 11th to the 13th centuries. Following that initial trip, he lectured and participated in academic conferences extensively abroad, including in Paris, Berlin, London, Strasbourg, Cologne, Munich, Granada and Bologna.

== Awards and honours ==
Świechowski was awarded the Officer's Cross of the Order of Polonia Restituta in 1997. In 2008 the Polish National Committee of the International Council on Monuments and Sites (ICOMOS) conferred on him the Jan Zachwatowicz Award. The Polish Ministry of Culture awarded him the Gold Medal, Gloria Artis, for contributions to culture in 2009. In 2012, Świechowski was awarded the Lednicki Piastowski Eagle for outstanding contributions in the research and dissemination of knowledge about the Piast dynasty, early rulers of Poland. He was also a member of the Polish Academy of Sciences.

== Photographic work ==
Photography performed a key role in Świechowski’s practice as a historian, using the camera not only to document the buildings and sites he visited, but also to alert a wider public to them and the importance of conserving them. Ewa Łużyniecka, author of Świechowski’s obituary in the journal Architectus, recalled when she worked with him in the early 2000s: “He was then already 82, but he still had the spirit of a student fascinated again with Cistercian architecture. I will always remember Professor walking fast with his camera and taking pictures.” Many of Świechowski’s books are extensively illustrated with his photographs, and photographs by him formed the core of a number of exhibitions.

The first of these, Gallia Romanica, comprised photographs of important examples of French Romanesque architecture and sculpture, taken by Świechowski during his first trip to France in the 1950s. It was first exhibited at the Institut français in Warsaw in the 1960s.

An expanded, updated version, Gallia Romanica: French Romanesque architecture and sculpture in the photographs of Zygmunt Świechowski, was exhibited in 2006 at the Museum of Architecture in Wrocław and subsequently at several museums in the Czech Republic including in Ostrava, Kutná Hora and Brno, accompanied by an extensively illustrated catalogue.

Another exhibition, English Cathedrals, took place at the Wrocław Museum of Architecture in 2011. This was later expanded into the exhibition Romanesque Churches of France and Gothic Cathedrals of England at the Museum of the Origins of the Polish State in Gniezno in 2013.

The Courtauld Institute of Art’s Conway Collection includes more than 500 photographs by Świechowski, which are currently being digitised as part of the Courtauld Connects project.

== Later life ==
Świechowski retired from academia in 1990, but remained active in his field. He was one of the leading figures in Patria Polonorum, which brought together several Polish organizations involved in the preservation and restoration of historic buildings and monuments. In 1991, when Patria Polonorum became affiliated to the Europe-wide heritage preservation body Europa Nostra, Świechowski as president of Patria Polonorum joined the general council of Europa Nostra.

From 1995 to 2000 he headed a Ministry of Culture research programme “The Millennium of the Council of Gniezno”. He joined the council of the Museum of Architecture in Wrocław in 2000. He was a member of and actively participated in the work of the international Committee for History and Conservation of Sacred Architecture at the International Council on Monuments and Sites.

Świechowski died in 2015, aged 95. His obituary in the journal Architectus quotes him as saying in 2008: “It is, after all, a safe and healthy profession spent in the attics and on the towers where the only danger one can face comes from the spiders disturbed by intruders destroying their webs, scared bats flying away or owls blinded with the flashlight. Climbing ladders, scaffoldings or rickety stairs and squeezing through narrow passages improves physical fitness.”

== Selected works ==
- Architektura na Slasku do polowy XIII wieku (1955), Budownictwo i Architektura, Warsaw (Architecture in Silesia until the mid XIII century)
- Budownictwo Romanskie W Polsce Katalog Zabytkow (1963), Polish Academy, Warsaw
- Sculpture romane d'Auvergne. Illustrations de l'auteur (1973), Éditions G. de Bussac, Clermont-Ferrand
- Romanische Reliefs von venezianischen Fassaden, "Patere e Formelle" (with Alberto Rizzi) (1982), Franz Steiner Verlag, Wiesbaden, ISBN 3515029435
- Romanesque art in Poland (1983) Arkady, Warsaw, ISBN 9788321331089 (translation of Sztuka romańska w Polsce (1982), Arkady, Warszawa, ISBN 9788321329253)
- Gallia romanica: architektura i rzeźba romańska we Francji w fotografii Zygmunta Świechowskiego (2006), Muzeum Architektury we Wrocławiu, Wrocław, ISBN 9788389262325
- The Architecture of the Cistercians in Poland: Polish and English Responses to French Art and Architecture: Contrasts and Similarities: Papers Delivered at the University of London/University of Warsaw History of Art Conference, Jan. and Sept. 1993, Ed. Francis Ames-Lewis (1995), Birkbeck College, London, ISBN 9780907904908
