= Sweden–GDR Association =

- Founded: 23 October 1956
- Dissolved: January 1991

The Sweden–GDR Association (Swedish: Förbundet Sverige–DDR) was a Swedish organization, formed on 23 October 1956 to promote ties between Sweden and the German Democratic Republic (GDR or East Germany). The association published the journal DDR-revyn.

The association was typically seen as pro-communist and ceased to exist in January 1991, following the reunification of Germany.

== Bibliography ==
- Abraham, Nils: Die Rolle der Freundschaftsgesellschaft "Schweden-DDR" in der Auslandspropaganda der DDR gegenüber Schweden nach 1972, in Den okände (?) grannen. Tysklandsrelaterad forskning i Sverige, 2005.
