= Sea centipede =

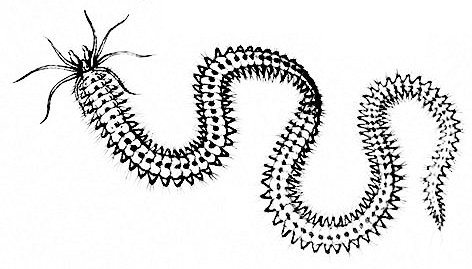
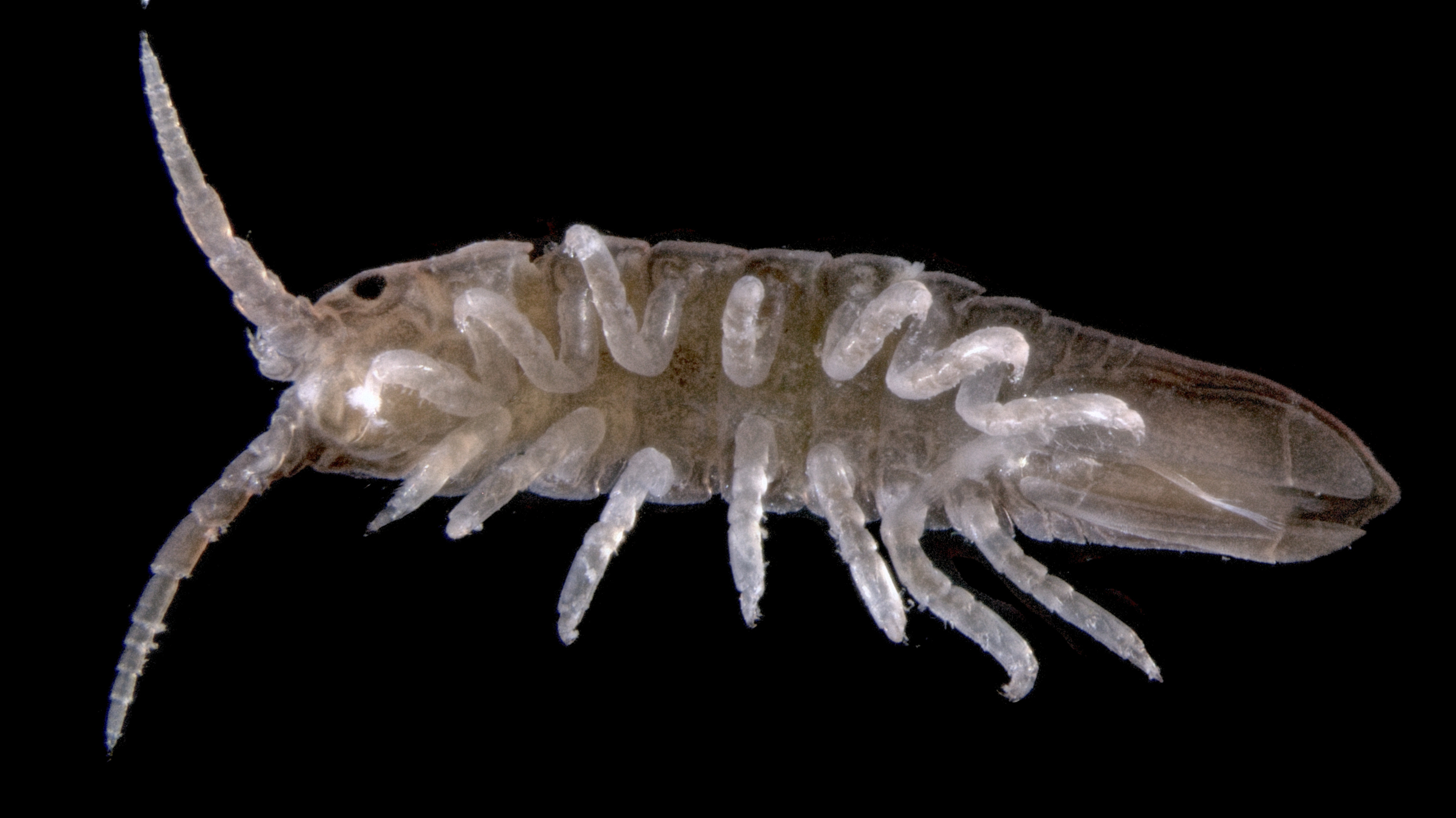
Polychaetes (top) and isopods are sometimes known as sea centipedes.

"Sea centipede" is a vernacular name that may refer to any of several real, mythological, or cryptozoological marine-dwelling animals, including:

- Various polychaete worms, especially in the family Nereididae
- Various marine Isopoda
- The many-finned sea serpent, or "great sea-centipede", a mythical sea creature

True centipedes (class Chilopoda) are venomous, many-legged arthropods, and while no living species are fully marine, several species inhabit the intertidal zone (including beaches and rocky shores), and can tolerate occasional inundation by seawater. These centipedes are primarily in the group Geophilomorpha, commonly known as soil centipedes.

== See also ==
- Sea scorpions or eurypterids, extinct marine arthropods distantly related to arachnids
- Sea snakes, venomous marine snakes
- Sea spiders or pycnogonids, marine arthropods
- Remipedes, the only venomous crustaceans
