= Alberto González Domínguez =

Argentine mathematician (1904–1982)

Alberto González Domínguez (11 April 1904 in Buenos Aires – 14 September 1982 in Buenos Aires) was an Argentine mathematician working on analysis, probability theory and quantum field theory.

González Domínguez received his Ph.D. from the University of Buenos Aires in 1939 under the direction of Julio Rey Pastor. That same year, González Domínguez received a Guggenheim Fellowship and worked for two years with Jacob Tamarkin at Brown University. González Domínguez spent most of his career as a professor at the University of Buenos Aires.
