= Irwin Bernstein =

American psychologist and primatologist

- Born: Irwin Samuel Bernstein; 1933 (age 92–93)
- Citizenship: United States
- Education: Cornell University; University of Chicago
- Scientific career
- Fields: Primatology; Psychology
- Workplaces: University of Georgia

Irwin Samuel Bernstein (born 1933) is an American primatologist, sociobiologist, and professor of psychology. He is a distinguished research professor emeritus at the University of Georgia Franklin College of Arts and Sciences. He investigates the social organization of nonhuman primates with a focus on agonistic and reproductive behavior.

== Early life and education ==
He received a B.A. in psychology from Cornell University in 1954 and a M.A. and Ph.D. in the same field from University of Chicago in 1955 and 1959, respectively. His graduate work focused on comparative and experimental psychology. In between 1955 and 1957, he was a lieutenant in the United States Air Force.

== Career ==
Bernstein was an active primatologist for six decades. He was a research professor at the Yerkes National Primate Research Center, and served as Professor of Psychology and Zoology, University of Georgia at Athens. His research interests include primate social behavior and the relationship between endocrine activity in primates and activities such as stress, aggression and sex. In 2001, he received the Distinguished Primatologist award from the American Society of Primatologists; the award "honors a primatologist who has had an outstanding career and made significant contributions to the field."

Despite retiring in 2011, Bernstein continued teaching as Professor Emeritus at University of Georgia. He resigned on the second day of classes in August 2021 after one of his students refused to wear a face mask during the COVID-19 pandemic.
