= Zygmunt Zalcwasser =

Polish mathematician (1898–1943)

Zygmunt Zalcwasser (1898 – 1943) was a Polish mathematician from the Warsaw School of Mathematics in the period between the World Wars collaborating especially in the fields of logic, set theory, general topology and real analysis. Zalcwasser, who worked on the Fourier series, introduced the Zalcwasser rank [Za] measuring the uniform convergence of sequences of continuous functions on the unit interval. Zalcwasser received his Ph.D. at the Warsaw University in 1928. He served as professor at the Wolna Wszechnica Polska in 1933–34 and after the invasion of Poland in 1939 lived in the Warsaw Ghetto. He was murdered in the gas chambers of the Treblinka extermination camp in 1943 during the Holocaust in Poland.
