= Indecomposable continuum =

Topological continuum undefinable as the union of any two proper subcontinua

The first four stages of the construction of the bucket handle as the limit of a series of nested intersections

In point-set topology, an indecomposable continuum is a continuum that is indecomposable, i.e. that cannot be expressed as the union of any two of its proper subcontinua. In 1910, L. E. J. Brouwer was the first to describe an indecomposable continuum.

Indecomposable continua have been used by topologists as a source of counterexamples. They also occur in dynamical systems.

== Definitions ==
A continuum $C$ is a nonempty compact connected metric space. The arc, the n-sphere, and the Hilbert cube are examples of path-connected continua; the topologist's sine curve is an example of a continuum that is not path-connected. The Warsaw circle is a path-connected continuum that is not locally path-connected. A subcontinuum $C'$ of a continuum $C$ is a closed, connected subset of $C$. A space is nondegenerate if it is not equal to a single point. A continuum $C$ is decomposable if there exist two subcontinua $A$ and $B$ of $C$ such that $A \neq C$ and $B \neq C$ but $A \cup B = C$. It follows that $A$ and $B$ are nondegenerate. A continuum that is not decomposable is an indecomposable continuum. A continuum $C$ in which every subcontinuum is indecomposable is said to be hereditarily indecomposable. A composant of an indecomposable continuum $C$ is a maximal set in which any two points lie within some proper subcontinuum of $C$. A continuum $C$ is irreducible between $c$ and $c'$ if $c, c' \in C$ and no proper subcontinuum contains both points. For a nondegenerate indecomposable metric continuum $X$, there exists an uncountable subset $J$ such that $X$ is irreducible between any two points of $J$.

== History ==
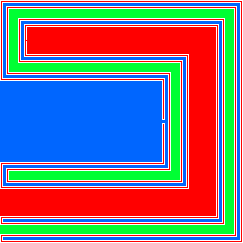
Fifth stage of the Lakes of Wada

In 1910 L. E. J. Brouwer described an indecomposable continuum that disproved a conjecture made by Arthur Moritz Schoenflies that, if $X_1$ and $X_2$ are open, connected, disjoint sets in $\mathbb{R}^2$ such that $\partial X_1 = \partial X_2$, then $\partial X_1 = \partial X_2$ must be the union of two closed, connected proper subsets. Zygmunt Janiszewski described more such indecomposable continua, including a version of the bucket handle. Janiszewski, however, focused on the irreducibility of these continua. In 1917 Kunizo Yoneyama described the Lakes of Wada (named after Takeo Wada) whose common boundary is indecomposable. In the 1920s indecomposable continua began to be studied by the Warsaw School of Mathematics in Fundamenta Mathematicae for their own sake, rather than as pathological counterexamples. Stefan Mazurkiewicz was the first to give the definition of indecomposability. In 1922 Bronisław Knaster described the pseudo-arc, the first example found of a hereditarily indecomposable continuum.

== Bucket handle example ==
Indecomposable continua are often constructed as the limit of a sequence of nested intersections, or (more generally) as the inverse limit of a sequence of continua. The buckethandle, or Brouwer–Janiszewski–Knaster continuum, is often considered the simplest example of an indecomposable continuum, and can be so constructed (see upper right). Alternatively, take the Cantor ternary set $\mathcal{C}$ projected onto the interval $[0,1]$ of the $x$-axis in the plane. Let $\mathcal{C}_0$ be the family of semicircles above the $x$-axis with center $(1/2,0)$ and with endpoints on $\mathcal{C}$ (which is symmetric about this point). Let $\mathcal{C}_1$ be the family of semicircles below the $x$-axis with center the midpoint of the interval $[2/3,1]$ and with endpoints in $\mathcal{C} \cap [2/3,1]$. Let $\mathcal{C}_i$ be the family of semicircles below the $x$-axis with center the midpoint of the interval $[2/3^i,3/3^i]$ and with endpoints in $\mathcal{C} \cap [2/3^i,3/3^i]$. Then the union of all such $\mathcal{C}_i$ is the bucket handle.

The bucket handle admits no Borel transversal, that is there is no Borel set containing exactly one point from each composant.

== Properties ==
In a sense, 'most' continua are indecomposable. Let $M$ be an $n$-cell with metric $d$, $2^M$ the set of all nonempty closed subsets of $M$, and $C(M)$ the hyperspace of all connected members of $2^M$ equipped with the Hausdorff metric $H_d$ defined by $H_d(A,B) = \max\{\sup\{d(a, B) : a \in A\}, \sup\{d(b, A) : b \in B\}\}$. Then the set of nondegenerate indecomposable subcontinua of $M$ is dense in $C(M)$.

== In dynamical systems ==
In 1932 George Birkhoff described his "remarkable closed curve", a homeomorphism of the annulus that contained an invariant continuum. Marie Charpentier showed that this continuum was indecomposable, the first link from indecomposable continua to dynamical systems. The invariant set of a certain Smale horseshoe map is the bucket handle. Marcy Barge and others have extensively studied indecomposable continua in dynamical systems.

== See also ==
- Indecomposability (constructive mathematics)
- Lakes of Wada, three open subsets of the plane whose boundary is an indecomposable continuum
- Solenoid
- Sierpinski carpet
