= Bronisław Knaster =

Polish mathematician (1893–1980)

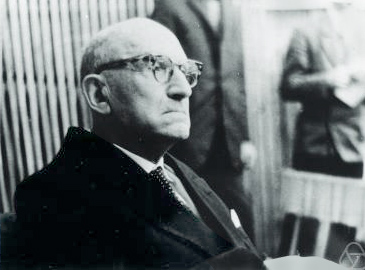
- Bronisław Knaster
- Born: 22 May 1893; Warsaw, Congress Poland, Russian Empire
- Died: 3 November 1980 (aged 87); Wrocław, Poland
- Education: University of Wrocław
- Known for: Knaster–Kuratowski–Mazurkiewicz lemma Knaster–Tarski theorem Knaster–Kuratowski fan Knaster's condition Knaster continuum Dendroid; Pseudo-arc
- Scientific career
- Fields: Mathematics
- Workplaces: University of Wrocław
- Thesis: Un continu dont tout sous-continu est indécomposable (1922)
- Doctoral advisor: Stefan Mazurkiewicz

Bronisław Knaster (Polish: [brɔˈɲiswaf ˈknastɛr]; 22 May 1893 – 3 November 1980) was a Polish mathematician and professor at the University of Lviv and the University of Wrocław. His main areas of research included point-set topology and continuum theory.

== Life and career ==
Knaster was born on 22 May 1893 in Warsaw, then part of Congress Poland within the Russian Empire, to physician Ludwik Knaster and Felicja (née Wiernik).

In 1911, after completing his secondary education, he enrolled at the Sorbonne in Paris to study medicine. In 1914, when he obtained his doctor's qualifications, he returned to Warsaw. The following year, he started studying mathematics at the University of Warsaw where his teachers included Stefan Mazurkiewicz, Zygmunt Janiszewski and Wacław Sierpiński, the founders of the Warsaw School of Mathematics.

In 1922, Knaster earned his doctorate at the University of Warsaw under Mazurkiewicz on the basis of his thesis Un continu dont tout sous-continu est indécomposable. In 1933, he co-authored with Witold Hurewicz Ein Einbettungessatz über henkelfreie Kontinua.

Since 1939, Knaster worked as professor at the University of Lviv. During the Nazi occupation of Lwów (1941–1944), he was employed at Professor Rudolf Weigl's Typhus Research Institute as a lice feeder, alongside Stefan Banach.

In 1945, he completed a project in collaboration with Karol Borsuk and Kazimierz Kuratowski concerning the establishment of the Institute of Mathematics of the Polish Academy of Sciences.

He is known for his work in point-set topology and in particular for his discoveries in 1922 of the hereditarily indecomposable continuum or pseudo-arc and of the Knaster continuum, or buckethandle continuum. Together with his teacher Hugo Steinhaus and his colleague Stefan Banach, he also developed the last diminisher procedure for fair cake cutting. He also introduced the term dendroid, a type of topological space, when working at the University of Wrocław.

In 1950, Knaster received the Golden Cross of Merit. In 1955, he was awarded the Officer's Cross of the Order of Polonia Restituta for "his contributions to professional work in the field of higher education". Knaster's notable doctoral students included J. J. Charatonik, Roman Duda, Jerzy Mioduszewski, and Meir Reichaw.

== See also ==
- List of Polish mathematicians
