= Edwin E. Moise =

American mathematician (1918–1998)

Edwin Evariste Moïse
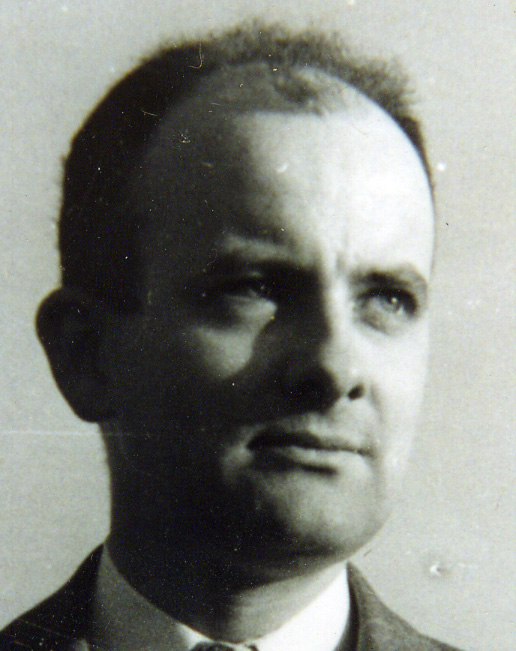
- Born: December 22, 1918; New Orleans, Louisiana
- Died: December 18, 1998 (aged 79); New York, New York
- Education: University of Texas
- Known for: 3-manifolds; SMSG; Moise's theorem
- Scientific career
- Fields: Mathematician
- Workplaces: University of Michigan; Institute for Advanced Study; Harvard University; Queens College
- Doctoral advisor: Robert Lee Moore
- Doctoral students: James Munkres; Peter Shalen

Edwin Evariste Moïse (/moʊˈiːz/; December 22, 1918 – December 18, 1998) was an American mathematician and mathematics education reformer. After his retirement from mathematics he became a literary critic of 19th-century English poetry and had several notes published in that field.

== Early life and education ==
Edwin E. Moïse was born December 22, 1918, in New Orleans, Louisiana. He graduated from Tulane University in 1940. He worked as a cryptanalyst and Japanese translator for the Office of the Chief of Naval Operations during World War II.

He received his Doctor of Philosophy in mathematics from the University of Texas in 1947. His dissertation was titled "An indecomposable continuum which is homeomorphic to each of its nondegenerate subcontinua," a topic in continuum theory, and was written under the direction of Robert Lee Moore. In his dissertation Moise coined the term pseudo-arc.

== Career ==
Moïse taught at the University of Michigan from 1947 to 1960. He was James B. Conant Professor of education and mathematics at Harvard University from 1960 to 1971. He held a Distinguished Professorship at Queens College, City University of New York from 1971 to 1987.

Moïse started working on the topology of 3-manifolds while at the University of Michigan. During 1949–1951 he held an appointment at the Institute for Advanced Study during which he proved Moise's theorem that every 3-manifold can be triangulated in an essentially unique way.

Moïse joined the School Mathematics Study Group when it started in 1958, as a member of the geometry writing team. The team produced several course outlines and sample pages for a 10th grade geometry course, and then Moïse and Floyd L. Downs wrote a geometry textbook, based on the team's approach, that was published in 1964. The textbook used metric postulates instead of Euclid's postulates, a controversial approach supported by some mathematicians such as Saunders Mac Lane but opposed by others such as Alexander Wittenberg and Morris Kline.

Moïse was a president of the Mathematical Association of America, a vice-president of the American Mathematical Society, a Fellow of the American Academy of Arts and Sciences, and was on the executive committee of the International Commission on Mathematical Instruction.

In the mid-1960s, Moïse came out conspicuously and publicly against the Vietnam War; he was among the first senior faculty members at Harvard to do so.

Moïse retired from Queens College in 1987 and started a second career studying 19th century English poetry. He had six short notes of literary criticism published.

Moise died in New York City on December 18, 1998, aged 79.

== Selected publications ==
- Moïse, Edwin E. (1966). The Number Systems of Elementary Mathematics; Counting, Measurement, and Coordinates. Reading, MA: Addison-Wesley. OCLC 359171.
- Ibid. (1972) [1967]. Calculus (2nd ed.). Reading, MA: Addison-Wesley. OCLC 363809.
- Ibid. (1977). Geometric Topology in Dimensions 2 and 3. New York: New York : Springer-Verlag. ISBN 978-0-387-90220-3.
- Ibid. (1982). Introductory Problem Courses in Analysis and Topology. Berlin: Springer-Verlag. ISBN 978-0-387-90701-7.
- Ibid. (1990) [1963]. Elementary Geometry from an Advanced Standpoint (3rd ed.). Boston: Addison-Wesley. ISBN 978-0-201-50867-3.
- Ibid.; Downs, Floyd (1991) [1964]. Geometry. Reading, MA: Addison Wesley Publishing Company. ISBN 978-0-201-25335-1.

== See also ==
- Moise's theorem – Any topological 3-manifold has unique PL and smooth structures
