= Wanda Szmielew =

Polish mathematician

- Born: 5 April 1918; Warsaw, Congress Poland
- Died: 27 August 1976 (aged 58); Warsaw, Poland
- Education: University of Warsaw (MA); University of California, Berkeley (PhD)
- Scientific career
- Fields: Mathematics, logic
- Thesis: Elementary properties of Abelian groups (1955)
- Doctoral advisor: Alfred Tarski

Wanda Szmielew née Montlak (5 April 1918 – 27 August 1976) was a Polish mathematical logician who first proved the decidability of the first-order theory of abelian groups.

== Life ==
Wanda Montlak was born on 5 April 1918 in Warsaw. She completed high school in 1935 and married, taking the name Szmielew. In the same year she entered the University of Warsaw, where she studied logic under Adolf Lindenbaum, Jan Łukasiewicz, Kazimierz Kuratowski, and Alfred Tarski. Her research at this time included work on the axiom of choice, but it was interrupted by the 1939 Invasion of Poland.

Szmielew became a surveyor during World War II, during which time she continued her research on her own, developing a decision procedure based on quantifier elimination for the theory of abelian groups. She also taught for the Polish underground. After the liberation of Poland, Szmielew took a position at the University of Łódź, which was founded in May 1945. In 1947, she published her paper on the axiom of choice, earned a master's degree from the University of Warsaw, and moved to Warsaw as a senior assistant.

In 1949 and 1950, Szmielew visited the University of California, Berkeley, where Tarski had found a permanent position after being exiled from Poland for the war. She lived in the home of Tarski and his wife as Tarski's mistress, leaving her husband behind in Poland, and completed a Ph.D. at Berkeley in 1950 under Tarski's supervision, with her dissertation consisting of her work on abelian groups. For the 1955 journal publication of these results, Tarski convinced Szmielew to rephrase her work in terms of his theory of arithmetical functions, a decision that caused this work to be described by Solomon Feferman as "unreadable". Later work by Eklof & Fischer (1972) re-proved Szmielew's result using more standard model-theoretic techniques.

Returning to Warsaw as an assistant professor, her interests shifted to the foundations of geometry. With Karol Borsuk, she published a text on the subject in 1955 (translated into English in 1960), and another monograph, published posthumously in 1981 and (in English translation) 1983.

She died of cancer on 27 August 1976 in Warsaw.

== Selected publications ==
- Szmielew, Wanda (1947), "On choices from finite sets", Fundamenta Mathematicae, 34 (1): 75–80, doi:10.4064/fm-34-1-75-80, ISSN 0016-2736, MR 0022539.
- Szmielew, Wanda (1955), "Elementary properties of Abelian groups", Fundamenta Mathematicae, 41 (2): 203–271, doi:10.4064/fm-41-2-203-271, ISSN 0016-2736, MR 0072131.
- Borsuk, Karol; Szmielew, Wanda (1955), Podstawy geometrii, Warsawa: Państwowe Wydawnictwo Naukowe, MR 0071791. Translated as Borsuk, Karol; Szmielew, Wanda (1960), Foundations of geometry: Euclidean and Bolyai-Lobachevskian geometry; projective geometry, Revised English translation, New York: Interscience Publishers, Inc., MR 0143072.
- Szmielew, Wanda (1981), Od geometrii afinicznej do euklidesowej, Biblioteka Matematyczna [Mathematics Library], vol. 55, Warsaw: Państwowe Wydawnictwo Naukowe (PWN), p. 172, ISBN 83-01-01374-5, MR 0664205. Translated as Szmielew, Wanda (1983), From affine to Euclidean geometry, Warsaw: PWN—Polish Scientific Publishers, ISBN 90-277-1243-3, MR 0720548.
- Schwabhäuser, W.; Szmielew, W.; Tarski, A. (1983), Metamathematische Methoden in der Geometrie, Hochschultext [University Textbooks], Berlin: Springer-Verlag, doi:10.1007/978-3-642-69418-9, ISBN 3-540-12958-8, MR 0731370.
