= Bagemihl =

Bagemihl is a surname. Notable people with the surname include:

- Bruce Bagemihl (fl. 1981), Canadian biologist and linguist
- Frederick Bagemihl (1920–2002), American mathematician
