= Cohomotopy set =

In mathematics, particularly algebraic topology, cohomotopy sets are particular contravariant functors from the category of pointed topological spaces and basepoint-preserving continuous maps to the category of sets and functions. They are dual to the homotopy groups, but less studied.

== Overview ==
The p-th cohomotopy set of a pointed topological space X is defined by

$$\pi^p(X) = [X,S^p]$$

the set of pointed homotopy classes of continuous mappings from $X$ to the p-sphere $S^p$.

For p = 1 this set has an abelian group structure, and is called the Bruschlinsky group. Provided $X$ is a CW-complex, it is isomorphic to the first cohomology group $H^1(X)$, since the circle $S^1$ is an Eilenberg–MacLane space of type $K(\mathbb{Z},1)$.

A theorem of Heinz Hopf states that if $X$ is a CW-complex of dimension at most p, then $[X,S^p]$ is in bijection with the p-th cohomology group $H^p(X)$.

The set $[X,S^p]$ also has a natural group structure if $X$ is a suspension $\Sigma Y$, such as a sphere $S^q$ for $q \ge 1$.

If X is not homotopy equivalent to a CW-complex, then $H^1(X)$ might not be isomorphic to $[X,S^1]$. A counterexample is given by the Warsaw circle, whose first cohomology group vanishes, but admits a map to $S^1$ which is not homotopic to a constant map.

== Properties ==
Some basic facts about cohomotopy sets, some more obvious than others:

- $\pi^p(S^q) = \pi_q(S^p)$ for all p and q.
- For $q= p + 1$ and $p > 2$, the group $\pi^p(S^q)$ is equal to $\mathbb{Z}_2$. (To prove this result, Lev Pontryagin developed the concept of framed cobordism.)
- If $f,g\colon X \to S^p$ has $\|f(x) - g(x)\| < 2$ for all x, then $[f] = [g]$, and the homotopy is smooth if f and g are.
- For $X$ a compact smooth manifold, $\pi^p(X)$ is isomorphic to the set of homotopy classes of smooth maps $X \to S^p$; in this case, every continuous map can be uniformly approximated by a smooth map and any homotopic smooth maps will be smoothly homotopic.
- If $X$ is an $m$-manifold, then $\pi^p(X)=0$ for $p > m$.
- If $X$ is an $m$-manifold with boundary, the set $\pi^p(X,\partial X)$ is canonically in bijection with the set of cobordism classes of codimension-p framed submanifolds of the interior $X \setminus \partial X$.
- The stable cohomotopy group of $X$ is the colimit

$$\pi^p_s(X) = \varinjlim_k{[\Sigma^k X, S^{p+k}]}$$
which is an abelian group.

== History ==
Cohomotopy sets were introduced by Karol Borsuk in 1936. A systematic examination was given by Edwin Spanier in 1949. The stable cohomotopy groups were defined by Franklin P. Peterson in 1956.
