= Dendrite (disambiguation) =

Dendrite derives from the Greek word "dendron" meaning (lit. "tree-like"), and may refer to:

== Biology ==
- Dendrite, a branched projection of a neuron
- Dendrite (non-neuronal), branching projections of certain skin cells and immune cells
- Dendrites (bug), a genus of shield bugs in the tribe Halyini

== Physical ==
- Dendrite (metal), a characteristic tree-like structure of crystals growing as molten metal freezes
- Dendrite (mathematics), a locally connected continuum that contains no simple closed curves
- Dendrite (crystal), a crystal that develops with a typical multi-branching tree-like form
- Dendrimer, a repetitively branched molecule

== Software ==
- Dendrite (matrix), a server for the matrix protocol written in Go

== See also ==
- Dendroid (disambiguation)
