= Elizabeth Cowley =

Elizabeth Cowley may refer to:

- Elizabeth Buchanan Cowley (1874–1945), American mathematician
- Elizabeth Jill Cowley (born 1940), British botanist
