= Dendroid (topology) =

Topological space

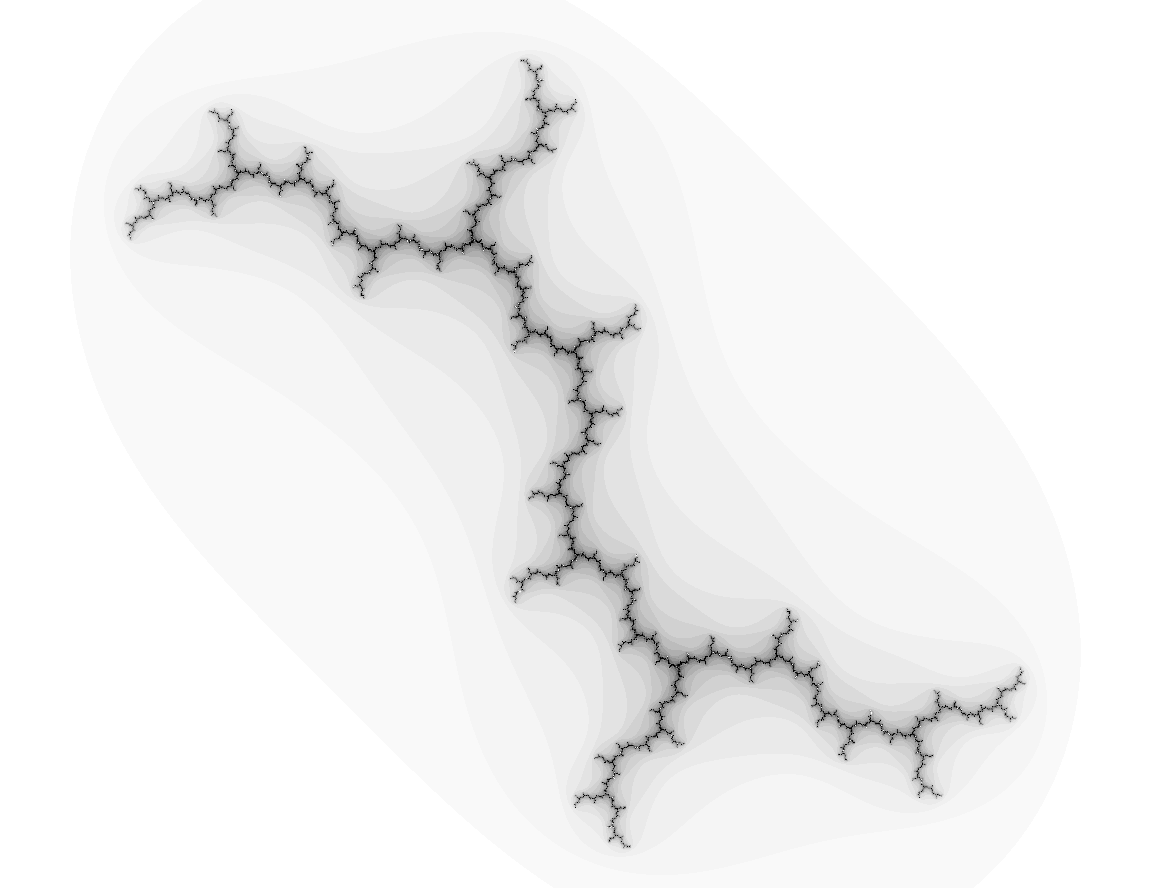
A dendrite such as this Julia set is a (locally connected) dendroid.

In mathematics, a dendroid is a type of topological space, satisfying the properties that it is hereditarily unicoherent (meaning that every subcontinuum of X is unicoherent), arcwise connected, and forms a continuum. The term dendroid was introduced by Bronisław Knaster lecturing at the University of Wrocław, although these spaces were studied earlier by Karol Borsuk and others.

Borsuk (1954) proved that dendroids have the fixed-point property: Every continuous function from a dendroid to itself has a fixed point. Cook (1970) proved that every dendroid is tree-like, meaning that it has arbitrarily fine open covers whose nerve is a tree. The more general question of whether every tree-like continuum has the fixed-point property, posed by Bing (1951), was solved in the negative by David P. Bellamy, who gave an example of a tree-like continuum without the fixed-point property.

In Knaster's original publication on dendroids, in 1961, he posed the problem of characterizing the dendroids which can be embedded into the Euclidean plane. This problem remains open. Another problem posed in the same year by Knaster, on the existence of an uncountable collection of dendroids with the property that no dendroid in the collection has a continuous surjection onto any other dendroid in the collection, was solved by Minc (2010) and Islas (2007), who gave an example of such a family.

A locally connected dendroid is called a dendrite. A cone over the Cantor set (called a Cantor fan) is an example of a dendroid that is not a dendrite.
