= Dendroid =

The word Dendroid derives from the Greek word "dendron" meaning (lit. "tree-like")

Dendroid may refer to:

- Dendroid (topology), in mathematics
- Dendroid (malware), Android malware
- Dendroidea, a grade of benthic graptolites commonly referred to as 'dendroids'

== See also ==
- Dendrite (disambiguation)
