= Karol Borsuk =

Polish mathematician (1905–1982)

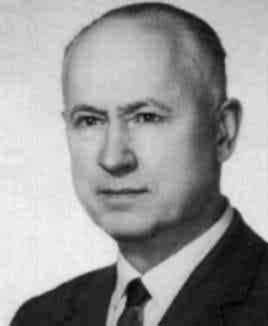
- Born: 8 May 1905; Warsaw, Congress Poland, Russian Empire
- Died: 24 January 1982 (aged 76); Warsaw, Poland
- Education: Warsaw University
- Known for: Borsuk's conjecture Borsuk–Ulam theorem Bing–Borsuk conjecture Cohomotopy set Absolute retract Absolute neighborhood retract Shape theory
- Spouse: Zofia Paczkowska
- Awards: Sierpiński Medal (1976)
- Scientific career
- Fields: Mathematics
- Thesis: On Retracts and Related Sets (1930)
- Doctoral advisor: Stefan Mazurkiewicz
- Notable students: Samuel Eilenberg; Jan Jaworowski; Krystyna Kuperberg; Włodzimierz Kuperberg; Andrzej Trybulec; Krzysztof Edward Haman

Karol Borsuk (8 May 1905 – 24 January 1982) was a Polish mathematician. His main area of interest was topology. He made significant contributions to shape theory, a term which he coined. He also obtained important results in functional analysis. He was a professor of mathematics at the University of Warsaw, a member of the Polish Academy of Sciences, the Polish Mathematical Society and a leading representative of the Warsaw School of Mathematics.

== Life and career ==
=== Early life and education ===
Borsuk was born in 1905 in Warsaw to father Marian, a surgeon, and mother Zofia (née Maciejewska). In 1923, he graduated from the Stanisław Staszic State Gymnasium in Warsaw. Between 1923 and 1927, he studied mathematics at the Faculty of Philosophy of the University of Warsaw.

He received his master's degree and doctorate from Warsaw University in 1927 and 1930, respectively. His PhD thesis title was On Retracts and Related Sets and his advisor was Stefan Mazurkiewicz. From 1929 to 1934, he worked at the Faculty of Mathematics at the University of Warsaw. He became a professor in 1938. In the interwar period, Borsuk visited Lwów, which was a thriving center of mathematics of the Second Polish Republic, and began his collaboration with Stanisław Ulam, especially in the field of topology. Borsuk joined the mathematicians in the Scottish Café and contributed to the open problems which they wrote down in the famous book.

=== World War II ===
During World War II, he ran a stationery store and provided a secret meeting place for the Home Army. He designed and published a number of board games including Animal Husbandry, which enjoyed great popularity and was re-released in 1997 as Superfarmer. In the years 1939–1944, he gave secret lectures at the University of Warsaw. In 1943, he was arrested for his participation in the resistance movement and spent a couple of months at the Pawiak Prison. During the Warsaw Uprising in 1944, he was transported alongside his family to the Dulag 121 Camp in Pruszków. He managed to escape from the camp and remained in hiding until the end of the war.

=== Later career ===
In 1945, he completed a project in collaboration with Bronisław Knaster and Kazimierz Kuratowski concerning the establishment of the Institute of Mathematics of the Polish Academy of Sciences. In 1946, he returned to the University of Warsaw where he served as the Head of the Institute of Mathematics from 1952 to 1964. In 1952, he became a member of the Polish Academy of Sciences, and in 1953, a corresponding member of the Bulgarian Academy of Sciences. He was also a member of the Polish Mathematical Society. He worked as an editor-in-chief of Dissertationes Mathematicae and deputy editor-in-chief of Fundamenta Mathematicae. In 1946–47, he lectured at the Institute for Advanced Study in Princeton, New Jersey, in 1959–60 at the University of California at Berkeley, in 1963–64 at the University of Wisconsin at Madison, and in 1967–68 at Rutgers University–New Brunswick. In 1954, he received the Officer's Cross of the Order of Polonia Restituta for his "outstanding contributions to science". In 1976, he was awarded an honorary doctorate by the University of Zagreb and became the recipient of the Sierpiński Medal conferred jointly by the Polish Mathematical Society and the University of Warsaw.

Borsuk's students include: Samuel Eilenberg, Andrzej Kirkor, Jan Jaworowski, Andrzej Granas, Antoni Kosiński, Karol Sieklucki, Włodzimierz Holsztyński, Rafał Molski, Hanna Patkowska, Andrzej Jankowski, Włodzimierz Kuperberg, Stanisław Spież, Krystyna Kuperberg, Jerzy Dydak, Andrzej Trybulec, Marian Orłowski, Alfred Surzycki.

== Research ==
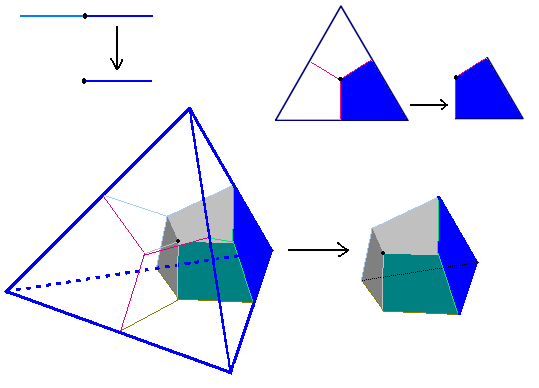
The illustration of the Borsuk conjecture in low dimensions

Borsuk introduced the theory of absolute retracts (ARs) and absolute neighborhood retracts (ANRs), and the cohomotopy groups, later called Borsuk–Spanier cohomotopy groups. He also founded shape theory. He has constructed various beautiful examples of topological spaces, e.g. an acyclic, 3-dimensional continuum which admits a fixed point free homeomorphism onto itself; also 2-dimensional, contractible polyhedra which have no free edge.

His topological and geometric conjectures and themes stimulated research for more than half a century; in particular, his open problems stimulated the infinite-dimensional topology. Some of the notable mathematical concepts that bear Borsuk's name include Borsuk's conjecture, Borsuk–Ulam theorem and Bing–Borsuk conjecture.

== Private life ==
In 1936, he married Zofia Paczkowska. One of his two daughters, Magdalena, who was a professor of paleontology, was married to Polish mathematician Andrzej Białynicki-Birula. He died in Warsaw in 1982 and was buried at the Powązki Cemetery. In 2008, a commemorative plaque in honor of Borsuk was unveiled at the entrance to the tenement house in Warsaw at Filtrowa 63 Street where the mathematician used to live.

== Works ==
- Geometria analityczna w n wymiarach (1950) (translated to English as Multidimensional Analytic Geometry, Polish Scientific Publishers, 1969)
- Podstawy geometrii (1955)
- Foundations of Geometry (1960) with Wanda Szmielew, North Holland publisher
- Theory of Retracts (1967), PWN, Warszawa.
- Theory of Shape (1975)
- Collected papers vol. I, (1983), PWN, Warszawa.

== See also ==
- Zygmunt Janiszewski – Polish mathematician (1888–1920
- Stanislaw Ulam – Polish mathematician and physicist (1909–1984)
- Scottish Café – Café in Lwów / Lviv
- Ham sandwich theorem – Theorem that any three objects in space can be simultaneously bisected by a plane
