= Composant =

Concept in point-set topology

In point-set topology, the composant of a point p in a continuum A is the union of all proper subcontinua of A that contain p. If a continuum is indecomposable, then its composants are pairwise disjoint. The composants of a continuum are dense in that continuum.
