= Rope-burning puzzle =

Mathematical puzzle

Visualisation of the rope-burning puzzle, the horizontal axis denoting time elapsed in seconds and vertical axis denoting burn time remaining on a rope (not its length).: 1. Lighting one end (red line) of a rope (brown line) burns it out in 60 s.; 2. Lighting both ends burns it out in 30 s.; 3. The standard solution with two ropes, initially the first with both ends lit and the second with just one. The first rope burning out triggers lighting of the second end of the second rope (blue arrow), burning it out in a total of 45 s.; 4. An alternative solution with the second rope initially unlit. The first rope burning out triggers lighting of both ends of and a random point on the second rope. Each time a segment burns out, a random point on the remaining rope is lit. In theory, the second rope burns out in 15 s, giving a total of 45 s.

Rope-burning puzzles are a class of mathematical puzzle in which one is given lengths of rope or fuses that each burn for a given amount of time, and matches to set them on fire, and must use them to measure a non-unit amount of time. The fusible numbers are defined as the amounts of time that can be measured in this way.

As well as being of recreational interest, these puzzles are sometimes posed at job interviews as a test of candidates' problem-solving ability, and have been suggested as an activity for middle school mathematics students.

== Example ==
A common and simple version of this problem asks to measure a time of 45 seconds using only two fuses that each burn for a minute. The assumptions of the problem are usually specified in a way that prevents measuring out 3/4 of the length of one fuse and burning it end-to-end, for instance by stating that the fuses burn unevenly along their length.

One solution to this problem is to perform the following steps:

- Light one end of the first fuse, and both ends of the second fuse.
- Once the second fuse has burned out, 30 seconds have elapsed, and there are 30 seconds of burn time left on the first fuse. Light the other end of the first fuse.
- Once the first fuse burns out, 45 seconds have elapsed.

Many other variations are possible, in some cases using fuses that burn for different amounts of time from each other.

== Fusible numbers ==
Visualisation of the smallest fusible numbers larger than 0, 1 and 2: 1/2, 1 1/8 and 2 1/1024, respectively (bold)

In common versions of the problem, each fuse lasts for a unit length of time, and the only operations used or allowed in the solution are to light one or both ends of a fuse at known times, determined either as the start of the solution or as the time that another fuse burns out. If only one end of a fuse is lit at time $x$, it will burn out at time $x+1$. If both ends of a fuse are lit at times $x$ and $y$, it will burn out at time $(x+y+1)/2$, because a portion of $y-x$ is burnt at the original rate, and the remaining portion of $1-(y-x)$ is burnt at twice the original rate, hence the fuse burns out at

$$x+(y-x)+[1-(y-x)]/2=(x+y+1)/2$$.

A number $x$ is a fusible number if it is possible to use unit-time fuses to measure out $x$ units of time using only these operations. For instance, by the solution to the example problem, $\tfrac34$ is a fusible number.

One may assume without loss of generality that every fuse is lit at both ends, by replacing a fuse that is lit only at one end at time $x$ by two fuses, the first one lit at both ends at time $x$ and the second one lit at both ends at time $x+1/2$ when the first fuse burns out. In this way, the fusible numbers can be defined as the set of numbers that can be obtained from the number $0$ by repeated application of the operation $x,y\mapsto (x+y+1)/2$, applied to pairs $x,y$ that have already been obtained and for which $|x-y|<1$.

The fusible numbers include all of the non-negative integers, and are a well-ordered subset of the dyadic rational numbers, the fractions whose denominators are powers of two. Being well-ordered means that, if one chooses a decreasing sequence of fusible numbers, the sequence must always be finite. Among the well-ordered sets, their ordering can be classified as $\varepsilon_0$, an epsilon number (a special case of the infinite ordinal numbers). Because they are well-ordered, for each integer $n$ there is a unique smallest fusible number among the fusible numbers larger than $n$; it has the form $n+1/2^k$ for some $k$. This number $k$ grows very rapidly as a function of $n$, so rapidly that for $n=3$ it is (in Knuth's up-arrow notation for large numbers) already larger than $2\uparrow^9 16$. The existence of this number $k$, for each $n$, cannot be proven in Peano arithmetic, and $k(n)$ has growth rate at least as fast as $F_{\varepsilon_0}(n)$ in the fast-growing hierarchy.

== Lighting more than two points of a fuse ==
If the rules of the fuse-burning puzzles are interpreted to allow fuses to be lit at more points than their ends, a larger set of amounts of time can be measured. For instance, if a fuse is lit in such a way that, while it burns, it always has three ends burning (for instance, by lighting one point in the middle and one end, and then lighting another end or another point in the middle whenever one or two of the current lit points burn out) then it will burn for 1/3 of a unit of time rather than a whole unit. By representing a given amount of time as a sum of unit fractions, and successively burning fuses with multiple lit points so that they last for each unit fraction amount of time, it is possible to measure any rational number of units of time. However, keeping the desired number of flames lit, even on a single fuse, may require an infinite number of re-lighting steps.

The problem of representing a given rational number as a sum of unit fractions is closely related to the construction of Egyptian fractions, sums of distinct unit fractions; however, for fuse-burning problems there is no need for the fractions to be different from each other. Using known methods for Egyptian fractions one can prove that measuring a fractional amount of time $x/y$, with $x<y$, needs only $O(\sqrt{\log y})$ fuses (expressed in big O notation). An unproven conjecture of Paul Erdős on Egyptian fractions suggests that fewer fuses, $O(\log\log y)$, may always be enough.

== History ==
In a booklet on these puzzles titled Shoelace Clock Puzzles, created by Dick Hess for a 1998 Gathering 4 Gardner conference, Hess credits Harvard statistician Carl Morris as his original source for these puzzles.

== See also ==
- Water pouring puzzle, another class of puzzles involving the combination of measurements
- Goodstein's theorem, another problem with a sequence that grows comparably to $F_{\varepsilon_0}(n)$
