= Janiszewski's theorem =

Theorem in topology

In mathematics, Janiszewski's theorem, named after the Polish mathematician Zygmunt Janiszewski, is a result concerning the topology of the plane or extended plane. It states that if A and B are closed subsets of the extended plane with connected intersection, then any two points that can be connected by paths avoiding either A or B can be connected by a path avoiding both of them. The theorem has been used as a tool for proving the Jordan curve theorem and in complex function theory.
