= Jan Jaworowski =

Polish and American mathematician

Jan W. Jaworowski
- Born: March 2, 1928; Augustów, Poland
- Died: October 4, 2013 (aged 85); Bloomington, Indiana, United States
- Education: University of Warsaw
- Scientific career
- Fields: Mathematics
- Thesis: On the antipodal sets on a sphere and involutions of metric spaces (1955)
- Doctoral advisor: Karol Borsuk
- Doctoral students: Mary Mulry

Jan W. Jaworowski (March 2, 1928 in Augustów, Poland – April 10, 2013 in Bloomington, Indiana) was a Polish and American mathematician, topologist.

== Biography ==
His father was Jan Leonard Jaworowski, and his mother—Helena (maiden name Heybowicz).

Jaworowski graduated with a master's degree from the mathematics department of the University of Warsaw. He got his Ph.D. from the Polish Academy of Sciences in 1955, in Algebraic topology, under Karol Borsuk. He generalized the Borsuk–Ulam theorem about antipodes.

He taught at University of Warsaw, University of Ljubljana, and for years at The Indiana University Bloomington. He published 64 papers during his 57-years official career (and another 12 after his retirement in 1995). He was a promoter of at least 11 doctoral theses.

He was a member of the Institute for Advanced Study during the 1960/61.

Jaworowski specialized in the transformation groups theory.
