= Pseudo-arc =

Type of topological continuum

In general topology, the pseudo-arc is the simplest nondegenerate hereditarily indecomposable continuum. The pseudo-arc is an arc-like homogeneous continuum, and played a central role in the classification of homogeneous planar continua. R. H. Bing proved that, in a certain well-defined sense, most continua in $\R^n,$ n ≥ 2, are homeomorphic to the pseudo-arc.

== History ==
In 1920, Bronisław Knaster and Kazimierz Kuratowski asked whether a nondegenerate homogeneous continuum in the Euclidean plane $\R^2$ must be a Jordan curve. In 1921, Stefan Mazurkiewicz asked whether a nondegenerate continuum in $\R^2$ that is homeomorphic to each of its nondegenerate subcontinua must be an arc. In 1922, Knaster discovered the first example of a hereditarily indecomposable continuum K, later named the pseudo-arc, giving a negative answer to a Mazurkiewicz question. In 1948, R. H. Bing proved that Knaster's continuum is homogeneous, i.e. for any two of its points there is a homeomorphism taking one to the other. Yet also in 1948, Edwin Moise showed that Knaster's continuum is homeomorphic to each of its non-degenerate subcontinua. Due to its resemblance to the fundamental property of the arc, namely, being homeomorphic to all its nondegenerate subcontinua, Moise called his example M a pseudo-arc. (Note: Henderson (1960) later showed that a decomposable continuum homeomorphic to all its nondegenerate subcontinua must be an arc.) Bing's construction is a modification of Moise's construction of M, which he had first heard described in a lecture. In 1951, Bing proved that all hereditarily indecomposable arc-like continua are homeomorphic — this implies that Knaster's K, Moise's M, and Bing's B are all homeomorphic. Bing also proved that the pseudo-arc is typical among the continua in a Euclidean space of dimension at least 2 or an infinite-dimensional separable Hilbert space. (Note: The history of the discovery of the pseudo-arc is described in Nadler (1992), pp. 228–229.) Bing and F. Burton Jones constructed a decomposable planar continuum that admits an open map onto the circle, with each point preimage homeomorphic to the pseudo-arc, called the circle of pseudo-arcs. Bing and Jones also showed that it is homogeneous. In 2016 Logan Hoehn and Lex Oversteegen classified all planar homogeneous continua, up to a homeomorphism, as the circle, pseudo-arc and circle of pseudo-arcs. A continuum is called "hereditarily equivalent" if it is homeomorphic to each of its non-degenerate sub-continua. In 2019 Hoehn and Oversteegen showed that the single point, the arc, and the pseudo-arc are topologically the only hereditarily equivalent planar continua, thus providing a complete solution to the planar case of Mazurkiewicz's problem from 1921.

== Construction ==
The following construction of the pseudo-arc follows Lewis (1999).

=== Chains ===
At the heart of the definition of the pseudo-arc is the concept of a chain, which is defined as follows:

A chain is a finite collection of open sets $\mathcal{C}=\{C_1,C_2,\ldots,C_n\}$ in a metric space such that $C_i\cap C_j\ne\emptyset$ if and only if $|i-j|\le1.$ The elements of a chain are called its links, and a chain is called an ε-chain if each of its links has diameter less than ε.

While being the simplest of the type of spaces listed above, the pseudo-arc is actually very complex. The concept of a chain being crooked (defined below) is what endows the pseudo-arc with its complexity. Informally, it requires a chain to follow a certain recursive zig-zag pattern in another chain. To 'move' from the m-th link of the larger chain to the n-th, the smaller chain must first move in a crooked manner from the m-th link to the (n − 1)-th link, then in a crooked manner to the (m + 1)-th link, and then finally to the n-th link.

More formally:

Let $\mathcal{C}$ and $\mathcal{D}$ be chains such that

1. each link of $\mathcal{D}$ is a subset of a link of $\mathcal{C}$, and
2. for any indices i, j, m, n with $D_i\cap C_m\ne\emptyset$, $D_j\cap C_n\ne\emptyset$, and $m<n-2$, there exist indices $k$ and $\ell$ with $i<k<\ell<j$ (or $i>k>\ell>j$) and $D_k\subseteq C_{n-1}$ and $D_\ell\subseteq C_{m+1}.$

Then $\mathcal{D}$ is crooked in $\mathcal{C}.$

=== Pseudo-arc ===
For any collection C of sets, let C* denote the union of all of the elements of C. That is, let

$$C^*=\bigcup_{S\in C}S.$$

The pseudo-arc is defined as follows:

Let p, q be distinct points in the plane and $\left\{\mathcal{C}^{i}\right\}_{i\in\N}$ be a sequence of chains in the plane such that for each i,

1. the first link of $\mathcal{C}^i$ contains p and the last link contains q,
2. the chain $\mathcal{C}^i$ is a $1/2^i$-chain,
3. the closure of each link of $\mathcal{C}^{i+1}$ is a subset of some link of $\mathcal{C}^i$, and
4. the chain $\mathcal{C}^{i+1}$ is crooked in $\mathcal{C}^i$.

Let

$$P=\bigcap_{i\in\mathbb{N}}\left(\mathcal{C}^i\right)^{*}.$$

Then P is a pseudo-arc.
