= Lars Edvard Phragmén =

Swedish mathematician (1863–1937)

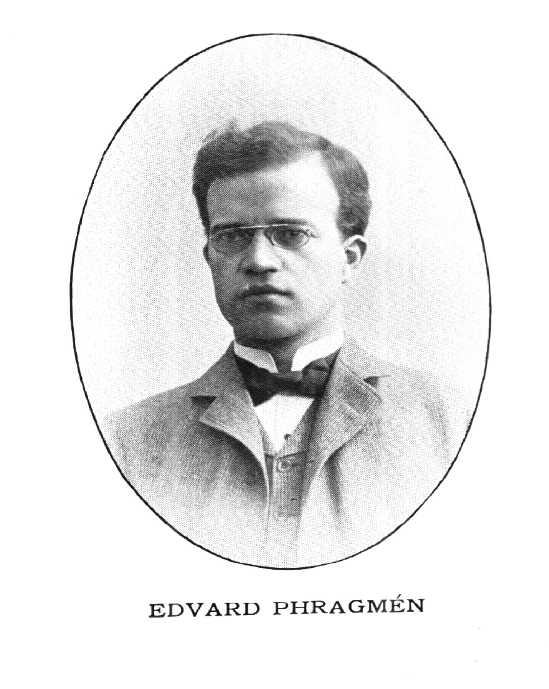

Lars Edvard Phragmén (2 September 1863, Örebro – 14 March 1937) was a Swedish mathematician who made contributions to complex analysis, voting theory, and actuarial science. He succeeded Sofia Kovalevskaia as professor of mathematical analysis at Stockholm University in 1892, where his research culminated in the development of the Phragmén–Lindelöf principle, and later served as president of the board of the Mittag-Leffler Institute. His pioneering "load-balancing" voting methods for proportional representation have experienced renewed interest in modern social choice theory and found practical application in Swedish parliamentary elections.

== Early life and career ==
He was the son of a college professor and studied at Uppsala University and Stockholm University, graduating from Uppsala in 1889. He succeeded Sofia Kovalevskaia as professor of mathematical analysis at Stockholm University in 1892, and in 1884 provided a new proof of the Cantor–Bendixson theorem. His research focused on elliptic functions and complex analysis, culminating in his 1904 publication in Acta Mathematica of an extension of a classical analytic theorem. That result was refined in collaboration with Ernst Lindelöf and is now known as the Phragmén–Lindelöf principle.

== Later life and recognition ==
After retiring from his chair of analysis at Stockholm in 1904, Phragmén continued to collaborate with Gösta Mittag-Leffler on the editing of Acta Mathematica, and from 1927 until his death served as president of the board of the Mittag-Leffler Institute. He was elected to numerous Swedish and foreign academies and scientific societies and also made contributions to applied mathematics, notably voting theory (e.g. Proportionella val, 1895) and actuarial science.

== Voting methods ==
In the 1890s, Phragmén developed a novel "load-balancing" framework for multiwinner elections in which each elected candidate incurs one unit of "load" that is shared among the voters approving that candidate. Different ways of measuring the evenness of the resulting voter‐load distribution give rise to three distinct rules: two optimization variants, one minimising the maximum voter load and one minimising the variance of loads, and a sequential variant, which greedily adds at each step the candidate whose approval support keeps the maximum load as low as possible. In addition, his earlier "Eneström–Phragmén" method adapted the single transferable vote principle to approval ballots. These methods generalise classical apportionment schemes—Phragmén's sequential rule extends the D'Hondt method, and his variance‐minimisation rule corresponds to the Sainte-Laguë method—and predate Thiele's Proportional Approval Voting by many decades.

Phragmén's rules have been the subject of renewed interest in modern social choice theory. The sequential variant is computable in polynomial time and satisfies proportional justified representation (a strong form of proportionality), while the optimization variants satisfy perfect representation. Their desirable properties, including various monotonicity axioms, have led to their adoption in Sweden for allocating seats within parties in parliamentary elections and to proposals for electing blockchain "validators" under nominated proof of stake protocols.

== See also ==
- Phragmen–Brouwer theorem
- Phragmen-Lindelof principle
- Phragmen's voting rules
