= Dendrite (mathematics) =

Locally connected dendroid

In mathematics, a dendrite is a certain type of topological space that may be characterized either as a locally connected dendroid or equivalently as a locally connected continuum that contains no simple closed curves.

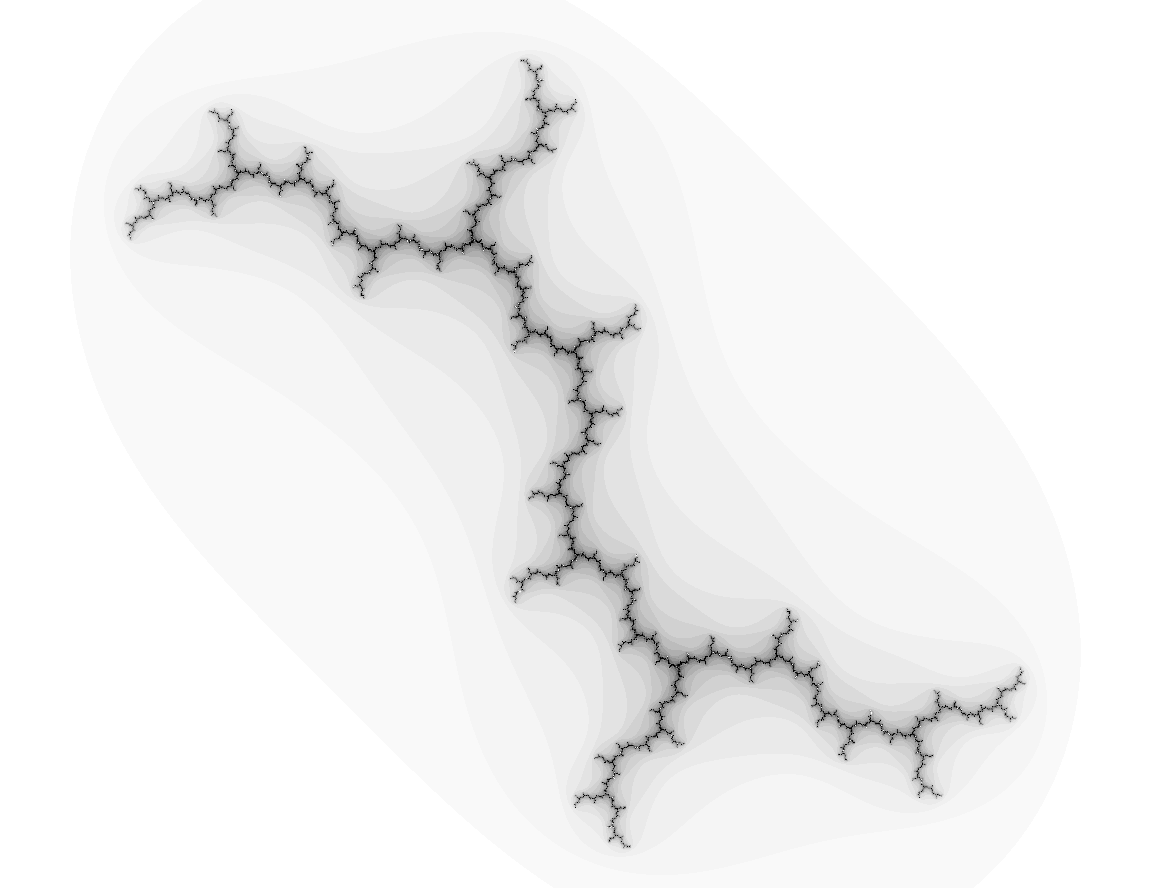
Dendrite Julia set

== Importance ==
Dendrites may be used to model certain types of Julia set. For example, if 0 is pre-periodic, but not periodic, under the function $f(z) = z^2 + c$, then the Julia set of $f$ is a dendrite: connected, without interior.

== See also ==
- Misiurewicz point
- Real tree, a related concept defined using metric spaces instead of topological spaces
- Dendroid (topology) and unicoherent space, two more general types of tree-like topological space
