= Unicoherent space =

Type of topological space

In mathematics, a unicoherent space is a topological space $X$ that is connected and in which the following property holds:

For any closed, connected $A, B \subset X$ with $X=A \cup B$, the intersection $A \cap B$ is connected.

For example, any closed interval on the real line is unicoherent, but a circle is not.

If a unicoherent space is more strongly hereditarily unicoherent (meaning that every subcontinuum is unicoherent) and arcwise connected, then it is called a dendroid. If in addition it is locally connected then it is called a dendrite. The Phragmen–Brouwer theorem states that, for locally connected spaces, unicoherence is equivalent to a separation property of the closed sets of the space.
