= Borsuk's conjecture =

Can every bounded subset of Rn be partitioned into (n+1) smaller diameter sets?

An example of a hexagon cut into three pieces of smaller diameter.

Unsolved problem in mathematics
What is the lowest $n$ such that not every bounded subset $E$ of the space $\mathbb{R}^n$ can be partitioned into $(n+1)$ sets, each of which has smaller diameter than $E$?
More unsolved problems in mathematics

The Borsuk problem in geometry, for historical reasons (Note: As Hinrichs and Richter say in the introduction to their work, the "Borsuk's conjecture [was] believed by many to be true for some decades" (hence commonly called a conjecture) so "it came as a surprise when Kahn and Kalai constructed finite sets showing the contrary". However, Karol Borsuk has formulated the problem just as a question, not suggesting the expected answer would be positive.) incorrectly called Borsuk's conjecture, is a question in discrete geometry. It is named after Karol Borsuk.

== Problem ==
In 1932, Karol Borsuk showed that an ordinary 3-dimensional ball in Euclidean space can be easily dissected into 4 solids, each of which has a smaller diameter than the ball, and generally $n$-dimensional ball can be covered with $n+1$ compact sets of diameters smaller than the ball. At the same time he proved, using Borsuk–Ulam theorem, that $n$ subsets are not enough in general. That led Borsuk to a general question:

Die folgende Frage bleibt offen: Lässt sich jede beschränkte Teilmenge $E$ des Raumes $\mathbb{R}^n$ in $(n+1)$ Mengen zerlegen, von denen jede einen kleineren Durchmesser als $E$ hat?

The following question remains open: Can every bounded subset $E$ of the space $\mathbb{R}^n$ be partitioned into $(n+1)$ sets, each of which has smaller diameter than $E$?

— Drei Sätze über die n-dimensionale euklidische Sphäre

The question was answered in the positive in the following cases:

- $n=2$ — which is the original result by Karol Borsuk (1932).
- $n=3$ — shown by Julian Perkal (1947), and independently, 8 years later, by H. G. Eggleston (1955). A simple proof was found later by Branko Grünbaum and Aladár Heppes.
- For all $n$ for smooth convex fields — shown by Hugo Hadwiger (1946).
- For all $n$ for centrally-symmetric fields — shown by A.S. Riesling (1971).
- For all $n$ for fields of revolution — shown by Boris Dekster (1995).

The problem was finally solved in 1993 by Jeff Kahn and Gil Kalai, who showed that the general answer to Borsuk's question is no. They claim that their construction shows that $n+1$ pieces do not suffice for $n=1325$ and for each $n\geqslant2015$. However, as pointed out by Bernulf Weißbach, the first part of this claim is, in fact, false. But after improving a suboptimal conclusion within the corresponding derivation, one can indeed verify one of the constructed point sets as a counterexample for $n=1325$ (as well as all higher dimensions up to 1560).

Their result was improved in 2003 by Hinrichs and Richter, who constructed finite sets for $n\geqslant298$, which cannot be partitioned into $n+11$ parts of smaller diameter.

In 2013, Andriy V. Bondarenko had shown that Borsuk's conjecture is false for all $n\geqslant65$. Shortly after, Thomas Jenrich derived a 64-dimensional counterexample from Bondarenko's construction, which stood as the record until May 2026, when Max Grinsztajn, assisted by OpenAI's GPT-5.5 Pro, lowered the minimum known failing dimension to 63 by constructing a 321-point three-distance configuration requiring at least 65 parts.

Apart from finding the minimum number $n$ of dimensions such that the number of pieces $\alpha(n)>n+1$, mathematicians are interested in finding the general behavior of the function $\alpha(n)$. Kahn and Kalai show that in general (that is, for $n$ sufficiently large), one needs $\alpha(n) \geqslant (1.2)^\sqrt{n}$ many pieces. They also quote the upper bound by Oded Schramm, who showed that for every $\varepsilon>0$ and sufficiently large $n$ (in terms of $\varepsilon$) one has $\alpha(n) \leqslant \left(\sqrt{3/2} + \varepsilon\right)^n=\left(1.2247\cdots + \varepsilon\right)^n$.

The correct order of magnitude of $\alpha(n)$ is still unknown, although it is conjectured that $\alpha(n)$ grows exponentially in $n$.

== Variations ==
Arguably, one of the most important unsolved problems about behavior of $\alpha(n)$ is whether considering only finite sets $E$ would change the value of the function, because it is not obvious a priori that a counterexample graph with infinite points can be converted into a finite one. In 2026, OpenAI claimed to have constructed counterexample to Borsuk's conjecture in $\mathbb{R}^{9}$, but the construction has infinitely many points and therefore (if correct) does not disprove finite variation of Borsuk's conjecture in $\mathbb{R}^{9}$.

Another point of interest is whether Borsuk's conjecture holds for two-distance sets.

Instead of working in $\mathbb{R}^n$ one may also consider $n$-dimensional hyperbolic or spherical spaces. In both cases, it is known that Borsuk's conjecture holds for $n=2$ and $n=3$.

Oded Schramm also worked on a related question: a body $K$ of constant width is said to have effective radius $r$ if $\text{Vol}(K)=r^n\text{Vol}(\mathbb{B}^{n} )$, where $\mathbb{B}^{n}$ is the unit ball in $\mathbb{R}^{n}$; he proved the lower bound $\sqrt{3+2/(n+1)}-1\leqslant r_n$, where $r_n$ is the smallest effective radius of a body of constant width 2 in $\mathbb{R}^{n}$ and asked if there exists $\varepsilon>0$ such that $r_n\leqslant 1-\varepsilon$ for all $n\geqslant2$, that is if the gap between the volumes of the smallest and largest constant-width bodies grows exponentially. In 2024, a preprint by Arman, Bondarenko, Nazarov, Prymak, Radchenko reported to have answered this question in the affirmative giving a construction that satisfies $\text{Vol}(K)\leqslant (0.9)^n\text{Vol}(\mathbb{B}^{n} )$.

== See also ==
- Hadwiger's conjecture on covering convex bodies with smaller copies of themselves
- Kahn–Kalai conjecture
