= Animal Husbandry (game) =

1943 dice game

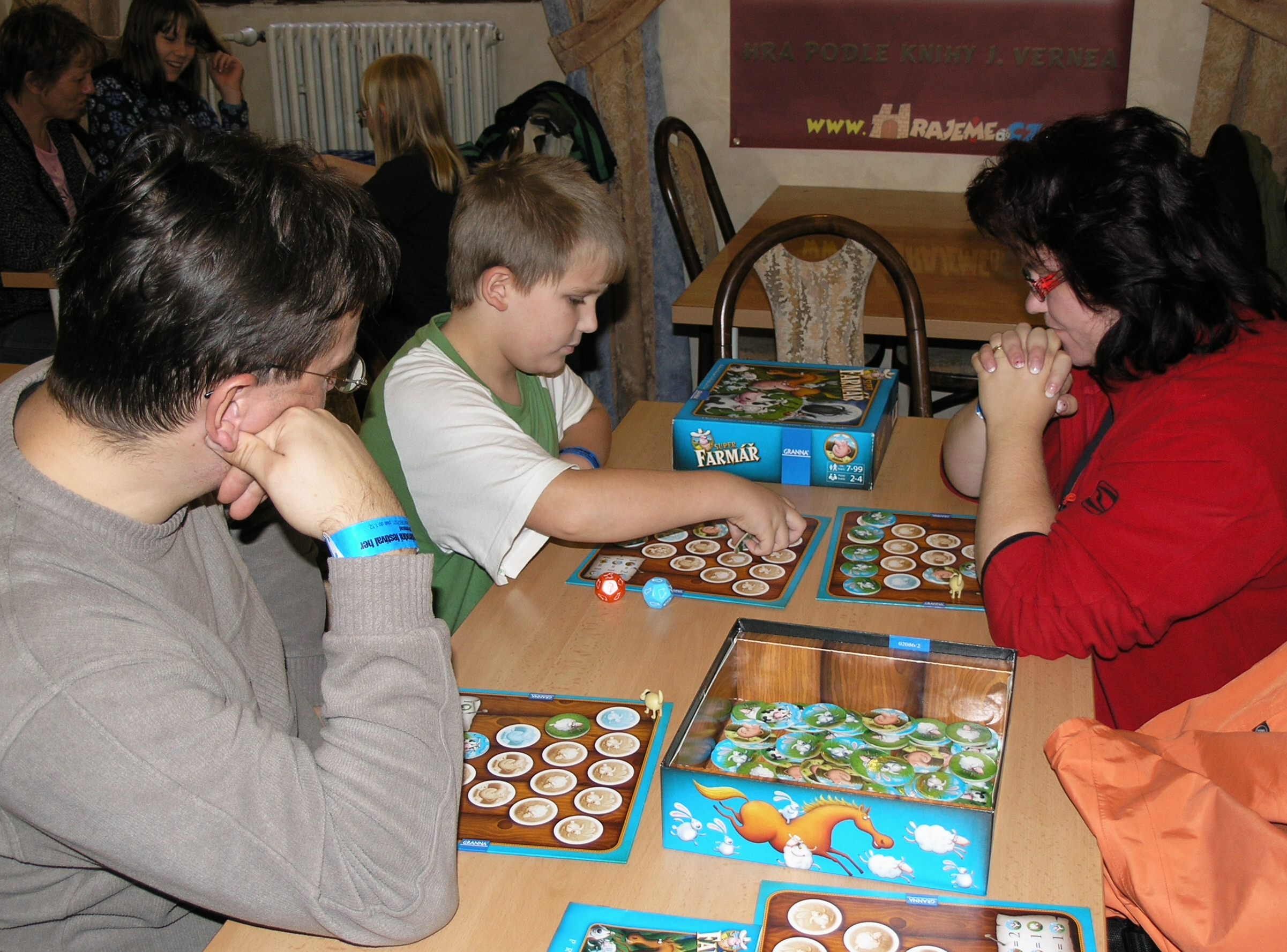
Animal Husbandry

Animal Husbandry (Polish: Hodowla zwierzątek) is a dice game invented and published by the Polish mathematician Karol Borsuk at his own expense in 1943, during the German occupation of Warsaw. The game was later released as Have You Herd? and Super Farmer.

== History ==
Sales of the game were a way for Borsuk to support his family after he lost his job following the closure by the German occupation authorities of Warsaw University. The original sets were produced by hand by Borsuk's wife, Zofia. The author of the drawings of animals was Janina Borsuk née Śliwicka. The game was one of the first in the world to feature 12-sided dice.

The game achieved great popularity, first among friends of the family and then among wider circles of friends and strangers. However, for decades, all copies were thought to have been lost during the Warsaw Uprising and the aftermath of post-war chaos in Poland. But in the 1990s, a surviving set was found intact – and with the permission of the Borsuk family, and on the occasion of Borsuk's 90th birthday and the 15th anniversary of his death it was re-introduced into the Polish market under the title Superfarmer by the publisher GRANNA sp. In 2017 another set was discovered, with a slightly different ruleset.

In 2010 the original game was re-issued under the original title and with original graphics for the Warsaw Rising Museum and is available in its gift shop. The new edition was one of the items featured at the 1 Euro Design exhibition at Warsaw's Institute of Industrial Design.

== Modern releases ==
Have You Herd?
- Box cover and game components
- Publishers: Winning Moves
- Players: 2 to 4
- Setup time: 5 minutes
- Playing time: 15–30 minutes
- Chance: High
- Skills: Dice-rolling; Set Collection

In subsequent years the game has been released in various languages, including English, German and Italian.

- In 2007, GRANNA released another Polish-language edition with a new graphic design by Peter Socha.
- Winning Moves Games USA released the game in the English market under the title Have You Herd? in 2008.
- A March, 2012 German-language release by Heidelberger Spielverlag also features Socha's design.
- In Finland it won the title for Best Family Board Game in 2013.

== Gameplay ==
There are several different rulesets, although the rules have only slight variations. More modern rulesets tend to be more balanced and provide a faster gameplay.

In the modern release, Have You Herd?, the goal is to get one of each of the farm animals: rabbit, sheep, pig, cow, and horse. Each player begins the game with a single rabbit (though, it is suggested by Winning Moves to start with a rabbit and sheep for a faster game). On their turn, a player performs three steps. First, they see if they can trade by consulting a chart. They can turn in sets of animals to get a tile of a different animal (for example, 5 rabbits can be traded for 1 sheep tile). After trading, the player rolls the two 12-sided dice. If they roll an animal that matches a tile they have, they get another tile of that type (for example, a player has a rabbit and rolls one. That player would get a rabbit tile). If the player rolls doubles, they get to roll again. There are a number of special events on the dice as well, such as the wolf (causes you to be unable to multiply and causes the player to roll the two dice and lose the animals shown unless they have a guard dog), the fox (cannot multiply animals, eats all but one rabbit unless you have the guard dog), the guard dog (protects you from a future wolf and foxes), the skunk (allows you to cause another player to miss their next turn), and the trade "T" (allows you to only trade with opponents instead of the bank). The game ends once one player has a rabbit, sheep, pig, cow, and horse.
