= Mary Mulry =

American statistician

Mary Helen Mulry (also published as Mary Mulry-Liggan) is an American demographic statistician who works for the United States Census Bureau and has published scholarly works about census accuracy.

== Education and career ==
Mulry majored in mathematics at Texas Christian University, graduating in 1972 as the university's top mathematics student. She went to Indiana University Bloomington for graduate study in mathematics, earning a master's degree in mathematics in 1975, a second master's degree in statistics in 1977, and a Ph.D. in mathematics in 1978. Her dissertation, Equivariant $\mathbb{Z}_p$-Extension Properties, concerned equivariant topology and was supervised by Jan Jaworowski.

Since completing her doctorate, Mulry has alternated between working for industry (at the System Planning Corporation, Lockheed Martin, M/A/R/C Research, and as an independent consultant) and for the United States Census Bureau (1980–1983, 1984–1997, and 2001–present). Since 2001 she has been a principal researcher for the Census Bureau, in the Center for Statistical Research and Methodology.

Mulry chaired the methodology section of the Washington Statistical Society in 1986–1987. She was vice president of the American Statistical Association from 2011 to 2013.

== Recognition ==
Mulry was elected as a Fellow of the American Statistical Association in 1994.
