= Phragmen–Brouwer theorem =

Equivalent properties in a normal connected locally connected topological space

In topology, the Phragmén–Brouwer theorem, introduced by Lars Edvard Phragmén and Luitzen Egbertus Jan Brouwer, states that if X is a normal connected locally connected topological space, then the following two properties are equivalent:

- If A and B are disjoint closed subsets whose union separates X, then either A or B separates X.
- X is unicoherent, meaning that if X is the union of two closed connected subsets, then their intersection is connected or empty.

The theorem remains true with the weaker condition that A and B be separated.
