= Elizabeth Buchanan Cowley =

American mathematician

Elizabeth Buchanan Cowley (1874–1945) was an American mathematician.

== Life ==
Cowley was born on May 22, 1874, in Allegheny, Pennsylvania. She had four siblings, but they and her father all died by 1900. Cowley's mother, Mary Junkin Buchanan Cowley, later became a member of the Board of Public Education of Pittsburgh, and was the namesake of the Mary J. Cowley School in Pittsburgh. Cowley's grandfather (Mary Cowley's father) was James Galloway Buchanan, a surgeon in the Union Army.

Cowley earned a bachelor's degree in 1893 from the Indiana State Normal School of Pennsylvania, and became a school teacher. She earned a second bachelor's degree in 1901 and a master's degree in 1902 from Vassar College, and became an instructor at Vassar, studying higher mathematics during the summers at the University of Chicago. In 1908 she completed a doctorate from Columbia University. Her dissertation, on algebraic curves, was supervised by Cassius Jackson Keyser; she became the fourth woman to earn a doctorate in mathematics from Columbia. Continuing to work at Vassar, Cowley was promoted to assistant professor in 1913, and associate professor in 1916. She went on leave in 1926 to assist her mother, and resigned her position at Vassar in 1929, instead becoming a high school teacher in Pittsburgh.

She retired from teaching in 1938, had a stroke in 1941, and died on April 13, 1945, in Fort Lauderdale, Florida.

== Contributions ==
Cowley and her co-author Ida Whiteside won a prize for a 1907 paper they wrote on the orbit of comet C/1825 V1. Another of her publications, in 1926, concerned liquid water pouring puzzles. She was the author of two textbooks on plane and solid geometry, published in 1932 and 1934, and advocated teaching solid geometry to high school students after many colleges had replaced the subject with freshman calculus. She published another book in 1941 about public education.

== Associations ==
Cowley was an early member of the Mathematical Association of America, and became a member of its board of trustees when it incorporated in 1920. She was an invited speaker at the International Congress of Mathematicians in 1932, speaking there about mathematics education. She also belonged to the American Mathematical Society, German Mathematical Society, and Circolo Matematico di Palermo.
