= Stefan Mazurkiewicz =

Polish mathematician (1888–1945)

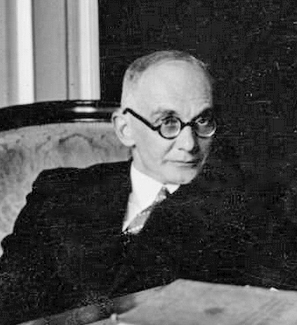
- Stefan Mazurkiewicz 1935
- Born: 25 September 1888; Warsaw, Congress Poland, Russian Empire
- Died: 19 June 1945 (aged 56); Grodzisk Mazowiecki, Poland
- Education: University of Lwów
- Known for: Knaster–Kuratowski–Mazurkiewicz lemma Hahn–Mazurkiewicz theorem Opaque set
- Scientific career
- Fields: Mathematics
- Workplaces: University of Warsaw
- Thesis: O krzywych wypełniajacych kwadrat (1913)
- Doctoral advisor: Wacław Sierpiński
- Doctoral students: Nachman Aronszajn; Karol Borsuk; Bronisław Knaster; Kazimierz Kuratowski; Aleksander Rajchman; Stanisław Saks; Antoni Zygmund

Stefan Mazurkiewicz (Polish: [mazurˈkjɛvit͡ʂ]; 25 September 1888 – 19 June 1945) was a Polish mathematician. He was a representative of the Warsaw School of Mathematics and worked in mathematical analysis, topology, and probability.

== Life and career ==
Mazurkiewicz was born on 25 September 1888 in Warsaw, then part of Congress Poland, to Jan, a lawyer, and Michalina (née Piotrowska). In 1906, he matriculated at the Jagiellonian University to study mathematics. After a year, he travelled to Western Europe and studied in Munich and Göttingen until 1912. During his time in Munich, Mazurkiewicz collaborated with Zygmunt Janiszewski working in set theory and topology. Upon his return in 1913, he earned his doctorate at the University of Lviv under Wacław Sierpiński based on his dissertation O krzywych wypełniajacych kwadrat (On Square-filling Curves).

In 1915, he became a professor at the University of Warsaw. In 1916, Mazurkiewicz introduced the concept of an opaque set: a collection of curves or segments that intersects all lines passing through a given region. In 1917, he became a member of the Warsaw Scientific Society.

During the Polish–Soviet War (1919–21), Mazurkiewicz as early as 1919 broke the most common Russian cipher for the Polish General Staff's cryptological agency. Thanks to this, orders issued by Soviet commander Mikhail Tukhachevsky's staff were known to Polish Army leaders. This contributed substantially, perhaps decisively, to Polish victory at the critical Battle of Warsaw and possibly to Poland's survival as an independent country.

Following Janiszewski’s death in 1920, Mazurkiewicz and Sierpiński assumed responsibility for editing Fundamenta Mathematicae, the journal he had established.

The Hahn-Mazurkiewicz theorem, a basic result on curves prompted by the phenomenon of space-filling curves, is named for Mazurkiewicz and Hans Hahn. His 1935 paper Sur l'existence des continus indécomposables is generally considered the most elegant piece of work in point-set topology.

In 1933-1935, Mazurkiewicz served as president of the Polish Mathematical Society. He was elected Dean of the Department of Mathematical and Natural Sciences of the University of Warsaw, holding this position for nine years.

Mazurkiewicz exerted a major influence on the emergence of the Polish School of Mathematics. He was a member of the Polish Academy of Learning (PAU). During his scientific career, he published 141 papers and supervised 11 doctoral students. His students included Karol Borsuk, Bronisław Knaster, Kazimierz Kuratowski, Stanisław Saks, and Antoni Zygmund. For a time Mazurkiewicz was a professor at the University of Paris; however, he spent most of his career as a professor at the University of Warsaw.

== See also ==
- Biuro Szyfrów
- List of Polish mathematicians
