= Marcy Barge =

American mathematician

Marcy Barge is a professor of mathematics at Montana State University, specializing in dynamical systems.

Barge received his Ph.D. from the University of Colorado at Boulder in 1980.

In 2012, Barge became a fellow of the American Mathematical Society.
