= Protorus =

Mathematical object

In mathematics, a protorus is a compact connected topological abelian group. Equivalently, it is a projective limit of tori (products of a finite number of copies of the circle group), or the Pontryagin dual of a discrete torsion-free abelian group.

Some examples of protori are given by solenoid groups.

== See also ==
- Duocylinder - Cartesian product of two disks
- Proprism
