= Solenoid (mathematics) =

Class of compact connected topological spaces

This page discusses a class of topological groups. For the wrapped loop of wire, see Solenoid.

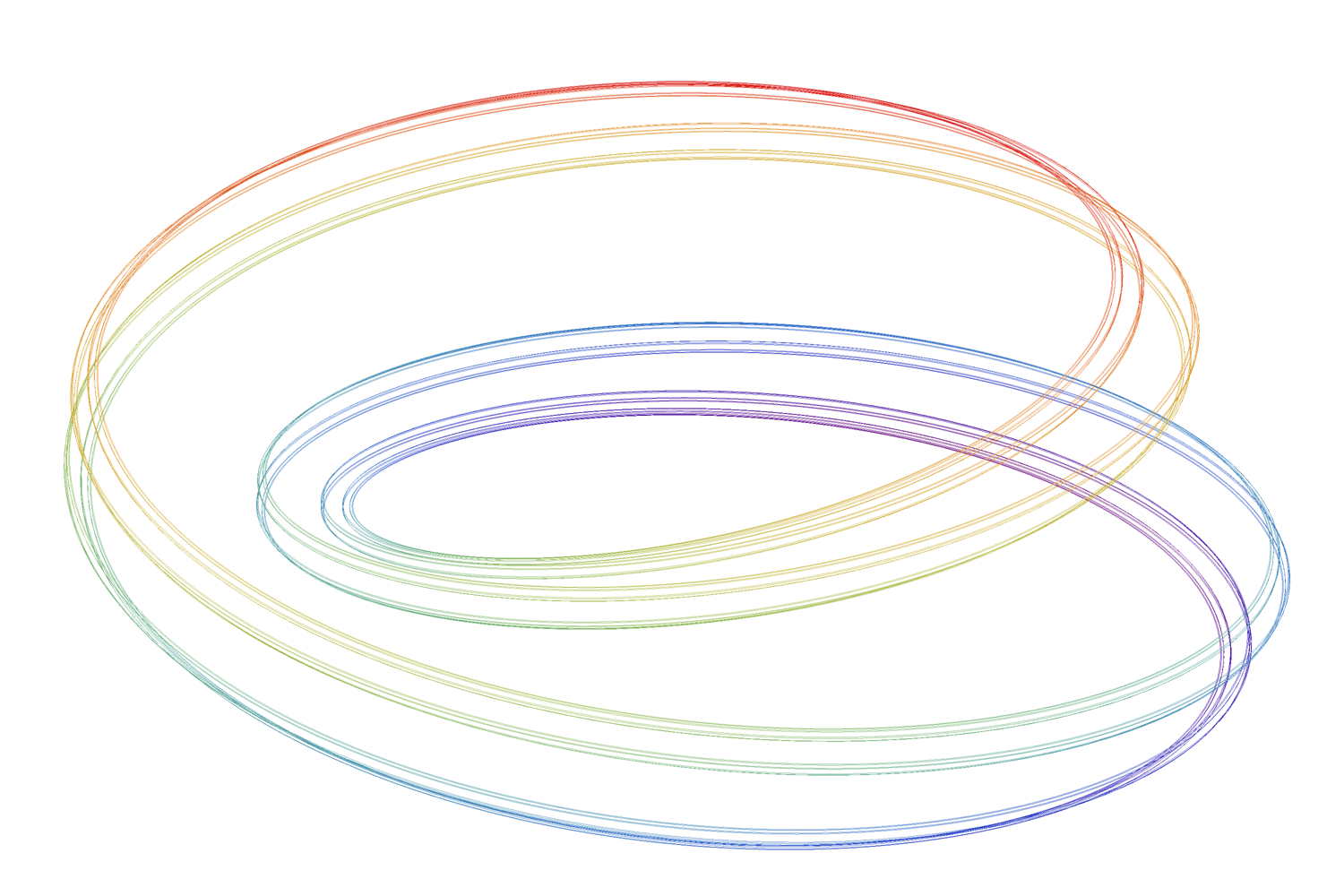
The Smale-Williams solenoid.

In mathematics, a solenoid is a compact connected topological space (i.e. a continuum) that may be obtained as the inverse limit of an inverse system of topological groups and continuous homomorphisms

$$f_i: S_{i+1} \to S_i \quad \forall i \ge 0$$

where each $S_i$ is a circle and f_{i} is the map that uniformly wraps the circle $S_{i+1}$ for $n_{i+1}$ times ($n_{i+1} \geq 2$) around the circle $S_i$. This construction can be carried out geometrically in the three-dimensional Euclidean space R^{3}. A solenoid is a one-dimensional homogeneous indecomposable continuum that has the structure of an abelian compact topological group.

Solenoids were first introduced by Vietoris for the $n_i = 2$ case, and by van Dantzig the $n_i = n$ case, where $n\geq 2$ is fixed. Such a solenoid arises as a one-dimensional expanding attractor, or Smale–Williams attractor, and forms an important example in the theory of hyperbolic dynamical systems.

== Construction ==
=== Geometric construction and the Smale–Williams attractor ===
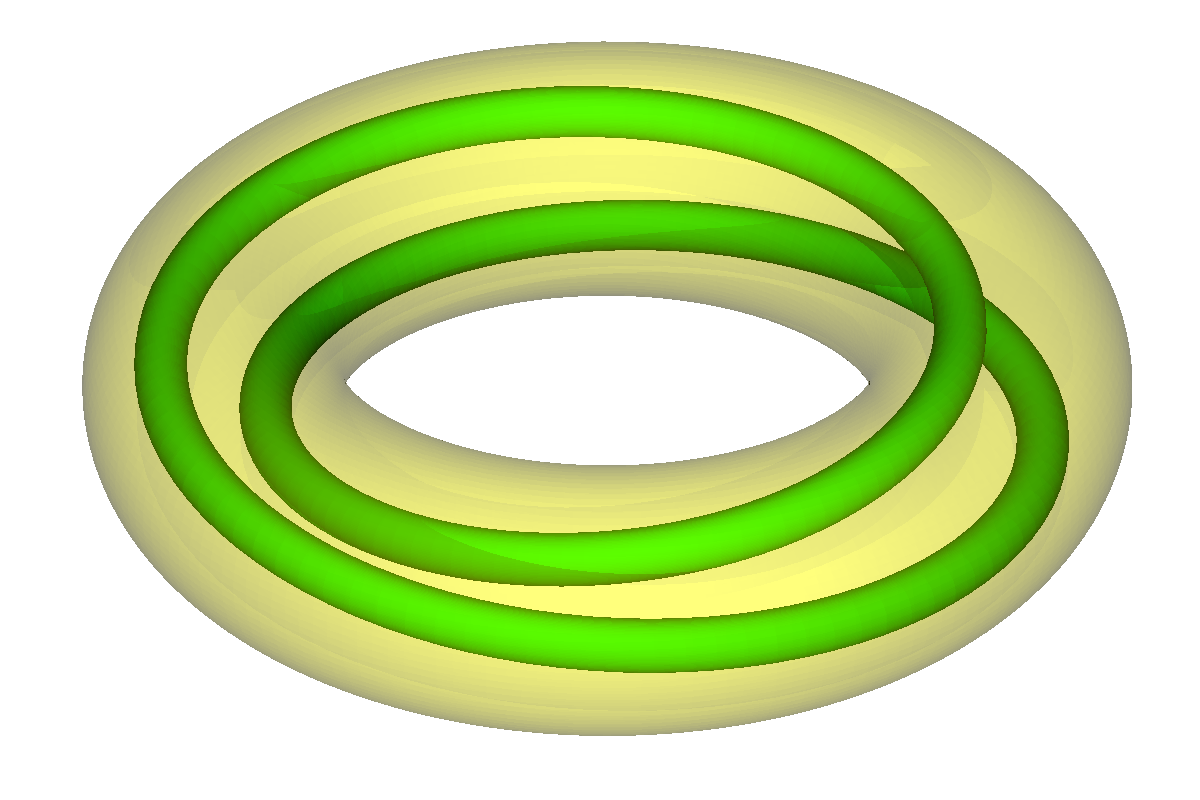
A solid torus wrapped twice around inside another solid torus in R^{3}

The first six steps in the construction of the Smale-Williams attractor.

Each solenoid may be constructed as the intersection of a nested system of embedded solid tori in R^{3}.

Fix a sequence of natural numbers {n_{i}}, n_{i} ≥ 2. Let T_{0} = S^{1} × D be a solid torus. For each i ≥ 0, choose a solid torus T_{i+1} that is wrapped longitudinally n_{i} times inside the solid torus T_{i}. Then their intersection

$$\Lambda=\bigcap_{i\ge 0}T_i$$

is homeomorphic to the solenoid constructed as the inverse limit of the system of circles with the maps determined by the sequence {n_{i}}.

Here is a variant of this construction isolated by Stephen Smale as an example of an expanding attractor in the theory of smooth dynamical systems. Denote the angular coordinate on the circle S^{1} by t (it is defined mod 2π) and consider the complex coordinate z on the two-dimensional unit disk D. Let f be the map of the solid torus T = S^{1} × D into itself given by the explicit formula

$$f(t,z) = \left(2t, \tfrac{1}{4}z + \tfrac{1}{2}e^{it}\right).$$

This map is a smooth embedding of T into itself that preserves the foliation by meridional disks (the constants 1/2 and 1/4 are somewhat arbitrary, but it is essential that 1/4 < 1/2 and 1/4 + 1/2 < 1). If T is imagined as a rubber tube, the map f stretches it in the longitudinal direction, contracts each meridional disk, and wraps the deformed tube twice inside T with twisting, but without self-intersections. The hyperbolic set Λ of the discrete dynamical system (T, f) is the intersection of the sequence of nested solid tori described above, where T_{i} is the image of T under the ith iteration of the map f. This set is a one-dimensional (in the sense of topological dimension) attractor, and the dynamics of f on Λ has the following interesting properties:

- meridional disks are the stable manifolds, each of which intersects Λ over a Cantor set
- periodic points of f are dense in Λ
- the map f is topologically transitive on Λ

General theory of solenoids and expanding attractors, not necessarily one-dimensional, was developed by R. F. Williams and involves a projective system of infinitely many copies of a compact branched manifold in place of the circle, together with an expanding self-immersion.

=== Construction in toroidal coordinates ===
In the toroidal coordinates with radius $R$, the solenoid can be parametrized by $t\in \R$ as
$$\zeta = 2\pi t, \quad re^{i\theta} = \sum_{k=1}^\infty r_k e^{2\pi i \omega_k t}$$
where

$\omega_k = \frac{1}{n_1 \cdots n_k}, \quad r_k = R \delta_1 \cdots \delta_k$

Here, $\delta_k$ are adjustable shape-parameters, with constraint $0 < \delta < 1 - \frac{1}{1 + \sin \frac{\pi}{n_k}}$. In particular, $\delta = \frac{1}{2n_k}$ works.

Let $S\subset \R^3$ be the solenoid constructed this way, then the topology of the solenoid is just the subset topology induced by the Euclidean topology on $\R^3$.

Since the parametrization is bijective, we can pullback the topology on $S$ to $\R$, which makes $\R$ itself the solenoid. This allows us to construct the inverse limit maps explicitly:
$$g_k: \R \to S_k, \quad g_k(t) = (r, \theta, \zeta)\text{ in toroidal coordinates, where } \zeta = 2\pi t, \quad re^{i\theta} = \sum_{k=1}^k r_k e^{2\pi i \omega_k t}$$

=== Construction by symbolic dynamics ===
Viewed as a set, the solenoid is just a Cantor-continuum of circles, wired together in a particular way. This suggests to us the construction by symbolic dynamics, where we start with a circle as a "racetrack", and append an "odometer" to keep track of which circle we are on.

Define $S = S^1 \times \prod_{k=1}^\infty \Z_{n_k}$ as the solenoid. Next, define addition on the odometer $\Z \times \prod_{k=1}^\infty \Z_{n_k} \to \prod_{k=1}^\infty \Z_{n_k}$, in the same way as p-adic numbers. Next, define addition on the solenoid $+: \R \times S \to S$ by
$$r + (\theta, n) = ((r + \theta \mod 1), \lfloor r + \theta \rfloor + n)$$
The topology on the solenoid is generated by the basis containing the subsets $S' \times Z'_{(m_1, ..., m_k)}$, where $S'$ is any open interval in $S^1$, and $Z'_{(m_1, ..., m_k)}$ is the set of all elements of $\prod_{k=1}^\infty \Z_{n_k}$ starting with the initial segment $(m_1, ..., m_k)$.

== Pathological properties ==
Solenoids are compact metrizable spaces that are connected, but not locally connected or path connected. This is reflected in their pathological behavior with respect to various homology theories, in contrast with the standard properties of homology for simplicial complexes. In Čech homology, one can construct a non-exact long homology sequence using a solenoid. In Steenrod-style homology theories, the 0th homology group of a solenoid may have a fairly complicated structure, even though a solenoid is a connected space.

== See also ==
- Protorus, a class of topological groups that includes the solenoids
- Pontryagin duality
- p-adic solenoid
- Profinite integer
