= Shape theory (mathematics) =

Branch of topology

Shape theory is a branch of topology that provides a more global view of the topological spaces than homotopy theory. The two coincide on compacta dominated homotopically by finite polyhedra. Shape theory associates with the Čech homology theory while homotopy theory associates with the singular homology theory.

== Background ==
Shape theory was invented and published by D. E. Christie in 1944; It was reinvented, further developed and promoted by the Polish mathematician Karol Borsuk in 1968. Actually, the name shape theory was coined by Borsuk.

=== Warsaw circle ===
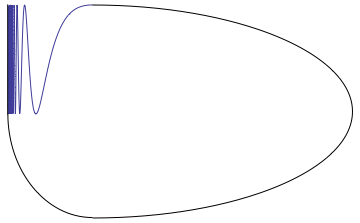
The Warsaw circle

Borsuk lived and worked in Warsaw, hence the name of one of the fundamental examples of the area, the Warsaw circle. It is a compact subset of the plane produced by "closing up" a topologist's sine curve (also called a Warsaw sine curve) with an arc. The homotopy groups of the Warsaw circle are all trivial, just like those of a point, and so any map between the Warsaw circle and a point induces a weak homotopy equivalence. However these two spaces are not homotopy equivalent. So by the Whitehead theorem, the Warsaw circle does not have the homotopy type of a CW complex.

== Historical development ==
Borsuk's shape theory was generalized onto arbitrary (non-metric) compact spaces, and even onto general categories, by Włodzimierz Holsztyński in year 1968/1969, and published in Fund. Math. 70, 157–168, y. 1971 (see Jean-Marc Cordier, Tim Porter, (1989) below). This was done in a continuous style, characteristic for the Čech homology rendered by Samuel Eilenberg and Norman Steenrod in their monograph Foundations of Algebraic Topology. Due to the circumstance, Holsztyński's paper was hardly noticed, and instead great popularity in the field was gained by a later paper by Sibe Mardešić and Jack Segal, Fund. Math. 72, 61–68, y.1971. Further developments are reflected by the references below, and by their contents.

For some purposes, like dynamical systems, more sophisticated invariants were developed under the name strong shape. Generalizations to noncommutative geometry, e.g. the shape theory for operator algebras have been found.

== See also ==
- List of topologies
