= Frederick Bagemihl =

American mathematician

Frederick Bagemihl (June 25, 1920 – April 12, 2002) was an American mathematician at University of Wisconsin–Milwaukee. He was a visiting scholar at the Institute for Advanced Study from 1953 to 1955.

== Bibliography ==
- Meromorphic functions with a single principal cluster set, Suomalainen tiedeakatemia, Helsinki, 1974, ISBN 9514101634
- Sequential and continuous limits of meromorphic functions, Suomalainen Tiedeakatemia, Helsinki, 1960, OCLC 247617805
