= Zygmunt Janiszewski =

Polish mathematician (1888–1920

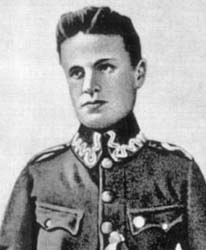
- Born: 12 July 1888; Warsaw, Vistula Land, Russian Empire
- Died: 3 January 1920 (aged 31); Lwów, Poland
- Resting place: Lychakiv cemetery, Lwów
- Education: University of Paris
- Known for: Janiszewski's theorem Brouwer–Janiszewski–Knaster continuum
- Scientific career
- Fields: Mathematics
- Workplaces: University of Warsaw
- Doctoral advisor: Henri Lebesgue
- Doctoral students: Kazimierz Kuratowski

Zygmunt Janiszewski (Polish: [ˈjaɲiˈʂɛfski]; 12 July 1888 – 3 January 1920) was a Polish mathematician, indpendence activist, a leading representative of the Warsaw School of Mathematics and the initiator of the idea of the Polish School of Mathematics.

== Early life and education ==
He was born to mother Julia Szulc-Chojnicka and father, Czeslaw Janiszewski who was a graduate of the University of Warsaw and served as the director of the Société du Crédit Municipal in Warsaw.

Janiszewski left Poland to study mathematics in Zürich, Munich and Göttingen, where he was taught by some of the most prominent mathematicians of the time, such as Heinrich Burkhardt, David Hilbert, Hermann Minkowski and Ernst Zermelo. He then went to Paris and in 1911 received his doctorate in topology under the supervision of Henri Lebesgue. His thesis was titled Sur les continus irréductibles entre deux points (On the Irreducible Continuous Curves Between Two Points). In 1913, he published a seminal work in the field of topology of surface entitled On Cutting the Plane by Continua.

== Career ==
Janiszewski taught at the University of Lwów and was professor at the University of Warsaw. At the outbreak of World War I he was a soldier in the Polish Legions of Józef Piłsudski, and took part in operations around Volyn. Along with other officers, he refused to swear an oath of allegiance to the Austrian government. He subsequently left the Legions and went into hiding under an assumed identity, Zygmunt Wicherkiewicz, in Boiska, near Zwoleń. From Boiska he moved on to Ewin, near Włoszczowa, where he directed a shelter for homeless children.

In 1917 he published an article "O potrzebach matematyki w Polsce" ("On the Needs of Mathematics in Poland") in the journal Nauka Polska (Polish Science), thus initiating the Polish School of Mathematics. He also founded the journal Fundamenta Mathematicae. Janiszewski proposed the journal's name in 1919, but the first issue was published only after his death in 1920.

Janiszewski devoted the family property that he had inherited from his father to charity and education. He also donated all the prize money that he received from mathematical awards and competitions to the education and development of young Polish students.

== Death ==
Janiszewski was engaged to Janina Kelles-Krauz, daughter of Kazimierz Kelles-Krauz. The wedding date had been set, but he died before they could marry. His life was cut short by the influenza pandemic of 1918–19, at Lwów, on 3 January 1920, at age 31. He willed his body for medical research, and his cranium for craniological study, desiring to be "useful after his death".

Samuel Dickstein wrote a commemorative address after Janiszewski's death, honoring his humility, kindness and dedication to his work:

Enthusiasm and strong will characterized Janiszewski not only in his scientific work, but in his life generally. His active participation in the Legions, his refusal to take an oath which was incompatible with his patriotic conscience, his work in the field of education, when at a most difficult time he entered that field as an enlightened and wise worker, free of any prejudice and partiality and ardently keen only to propagate light and truth - these facts prove that in the heart of a mathematician seemingly detached from active life there glowed the purest emotions of affection and self-denial. If we also mention that, having very moderate needs himself, he dispensed all the means at his disposal to educate young talents, and that he bequeathed the property that he had inherited from his parents for educational purposes, and in particular for the education of outstanding individuals, then we may indeed exclaim from the bottom of our hearts that the memory of that life, devoted to the cause and interrupted so early, lives on in its results and deeds and will remain treasured and living for us, the witnesses of his work, and for generations to come.

While Janiszewski is best remembered for his many contributions to topological mathematics in the early 20th century, for the founding of Fundamenta Mathematicae, and for his enthusiasm for teaching young minds.

On 3 January 2020, the 100th anniversary of his death, a researcher from Australia traveled to Lviv and met with the director of Lychakiv Cemetery. Restoration of the grave was arranged, and the stone was restored. Janiszewski is buried in field 58, plot 82 of Lychakiv Cemetery.

== Recognition ==
On 7 July 1931, Janiszewski was posthumously awarded the Cross of Independence for his work toward restoring Poland’s independence. Janiszewski has a street named in his honour in the city of Wrocław.

In 1982, the Polish Post issued a 12-złoty commemorative stamp featuring Janiszewski as part of the "Polish Mathematicians" series.

== See also ==
- List of Poles – Mathematics
