= Fundamenta Mathematicae =

Peer-reviewed mathematical journal

- Discipline: Mathematics
- Language: English

Publication details
- History: 1920; 106 years ago – present
- Publisher: Institute of Mathematics of the Polish Academy of Sciences (Poland)
- Impact factor: 0.609 (2016)

Standard abbreviations
- ISO 4: Fundam. Math.
- MathSciNet: Fund. Math.

Indexing
- ISSN: 0016-2736 (print); 1730-6329 (web)
- LCCN: 55032438
- OCLC no.: 1570315

Links
- Journal homepage; Online archive

Fundamenta Mathematicae is a peer-reviewed scientific journal of mathematics with a special focus on the foundations of mathematics, concentrating on set theory, mathematical logic, topology and its interactions with algebra, and dynamical systems.

The first specialized journal in the field of mathematics, originally it covered only topology, set theory, and foundations of mathematics. It is published by the Mathematics Institute of the Polish Academy of Sciences.

== History ==
The journal was conceived by Zygmunt Janiszewski as a means to foster mathematical research in Poland. Janiszewski posited that, to achieve its goal, the journal should not compel Polish mathematicians to submit articles written exclusively in Polish, and should be devoted only to a specialized topic in mathematics; Fundamenta Mathematicae thus became the first specialized journal in the field of mathematics.

Despite Janiszewski having, in a 1918 article, given the initial impetus for the creation of the journal, he did not live long enough to see the first issue published, in Warsaw, as he died on 3 January 1920. Wacław Sierpiński and Stefan Mazurkiewicz took over as editors-in-chief. Soon after its launch, the founding editors were joined by Kazimierz Kuratowski and, later, by Karol Borsuk. Between 1920-1939, 32 volumes of the journal were published. They comprised 932 papers by 212 authors from 19 countries. Notable foreign contributors included René Maurice Fréchet, Felix Hausdorff, Henri Lebesgue and Hans Hahn.

== Abstracting and indexing ==
The journal is abstracted and indexed in the Science Citation Index Expanded, Scopus, and Zentralblatt MATH. According to the Journal Citation Reports, the journal has a 2016 impact factor of 0.609.
