= Continuum (topology) =

Nonempty compact connected metric space

In the mathematical field of point-set topology, a continuum (plural: "continua") is a nonempty compact connected metric space, or, less frequently, a compact connected Hausdorff space. Continuum theory is the branch of topology devoted to the study of continua.

== Definitions ==
- A continuum that contains more than one point is called nondegenerate.
- A subset A of a continuum X such that A itself is a continuum is called a subcontinuum of X. A space homeomorphic to a subcontinuum of the Euclidean plane R^{2} is called a planar continuum.
- A continuum X is homogeneous if for every two points x and y in X, there exists a homeomorphism h: X → X such that h(x) = y.
- A Peano continuum is a continuum that is locally connected at each point.
- An indecomposable continuum is a continuum that cannot be represented as the union of two proper subcontinua. A continuum X is hereditarily indecomposable if every subcontinuum of X is indecomposable.
- The dimension of a continuum usually means its topological dimension. A one-dimensional continuum is often called a curve.

== Examples ==
- An arc is a space homeomorphic to the closed interval [0,1]. If h: [0,1] → X is a homeomorphism and h(0) = p and h(1) = q then p and q are called the endpoints of X; one also says that X is an arc from p to q. An arc is the simplest and most familiar type of a continuum. It is one-dimensional, arcwise connected, and locally connected.
- The topologist's sine curve is a subset of the plane that is the union of the graph of the function f(x) = sin(1/x), 0 < x ≤ 1 with the segment −1 ≤ y ≤ 1 of the y-axis. It is a one-dimensional continuum that is not arcwise connected, and it is locally disconnected at the points along the y-axis.
- The Warsaw circle is obtained by "closing up" the topologist's sine curve by an arc connecting (0,−1) and (1,sin(1)). It is a one-dimensional continuum whose homotopy groups are all trivial, but it is not a contractible space.

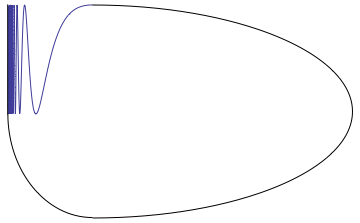
Warsaw circle

- A component of a particular compact Hausdorff space can be formulated in terms of continua; it is defined as a continuum that contains two arbitrary points of a compact and Hausdorff space.
- An n-cell is a space homeomorphic to the closed ball in the Euclidean space R^{n}. It is contractible and is the simplest example of an n-dimensional continuum.
- An n-sphere is a space homeomorphic to the standard n-sphere in the (n + 1)-dimensional Euclidean space. It is an n-dimensional homogeneous continuum that is not contractible, and therefore different from an n-cell.
- The Hilbert cube is an infinite-dimensional continuum.
- Solenoids are among the simplest examples of indecomposable homogeneous continua. They are neither arcwise connected nor locally connected.
- The Sierpinski carpet, also known as the Sierpinski universal curve, is a one-dimensional planar Peano continuum that contains a homeomorphic image of any one-dimensional planar continuum.
- The pseudo-arc is a homogeneous hereditarily indecomposable planar continuum.

== Properties ==
There are two fundamental techniques for constructing continua, by means of nested intersections and inverse limits.

- If {X_{n}} is a nested family of continua, i.e. X_{n} ⊇ X_{n+1}, then their intersection is a continuum.

- If {(X_{n}, f_{n})} is an inverse sequence of continua X_{n}, called the coordinate spaces, together with continuous maps f_{n}: X_{n+1} → X_{n}, called the bonding maps, then its inverse limit is a continuum.

A finite or countable product of continua is a continuum.

== See also ==
- Linear continuum
- Menger sponge
- Shape theory (mathematics)

== Sources ==
- Sam B. Nadler, Jr, Continuum theory. An introduction. Pure and Applied Mathematics, Marcel Dekker. ISBN 0-8247-8659-9.
- Hocking, John; Young, Gail (1988). Topology (Revised ed.). Dover Publications. ISBN 978-0486656762.
