= List of Polish mathematicians =

A list of notable Polish mathematicians:

Name	Image	Born	Died
Bruno Abakanowicz		6 Oct 1852; Ukmergė	29 Aug 1900; Paris
Kazimierz Abramowicz		4 Mar 1889; Brzeziny	10 Sep 1936; Poznań
Andrzej Alexiewicz		11 Feb 1917; Lviv	11 Jul 1995; Poznań
Krzysztof R. Apt		1949; Katowice	
Nachman Aronszajn		26 Jul 1907; Warsaw	5 Feb 1980; Corvallis
Tytus Babczyński		1830; Warsaw	1910
Stefan Banach		30 Mar 1892; Kraków	31 Aug 1945; Lviv
Tadeusz Banachiewicz		13 Feb 1882; Warsaw	17 Nov 1954; Kraków
Feliks Barański		May 1915; Lviv	2006; Kraków
Kazimierz Bartel		3 Mar 1882; Lviv	26 Jul 1941; Lviv
Tomek Bartoszyński		16 May 1957; Warsaw	
Andrzej Białynicki-Birula		26 Dec 1935; Navahrudak	19 Apr 2021
Mieczysław Biernacki		30 Mar 1891; Lublin	21 Nov 1959; Lublin
Karol Borsuk		8 May 1905; Warsaw	24 Jan 1982; Warsaw
Jerzy Browkin		5 Nov 1934; Lukiv	23 Nov 2015; Warsaw
Jan Brożek		1 Nov 1585; Kurzelów	21 Nov 1652; Bronowice Małe, Kraków
Albert Brudzewski		1445; Kalisz, Brudzew	1497; Vilnius
Leon Chwistek		13 Jun 1884; Kraków	20 Aug 1944; Barvikha, Barvikha
Zbigniew Ciesielski		1 Oct 1934; Gdańsk	5 Oct 2020; Sopot
Kazimierz Cwojdziński		8 Jan 1878; Plewiska	12 Aug 1948; Poznań
Adam Danielewicz		23 Dec 1846; Koźminek	25 Jun 1935; Warsaw
Ryszard Engelking		16 Nov 1935; Sosnowiec	16 Nov 2023; Warsaw
Tadeusz Figiel		2 Jul 1948; Gdańsk	8 Sep 2025
Urszula Forys		1965	
Kajetan Garbiński		1796; Warsaw	1847; Warsaw
Stanisław Gołąb		26 Jul 1902; Travnik	30 Apr 1980; Kraków
Stanisław Grzepski		1524, 1524	1570; Kraków
Edward Jan Habich		31 Jan 1835; Warsaw	31 Oct 1909; Lima
Witold Hurewicz		29 Jun 1904; Łódź	6 Sep 1956; Mérida
Henryk Iwaniec		9 Oct 1947; Elbląg	
Tadeusz Iwaniec		9 Oct 1947; Elbląg	
Zygmunt Janiszewski		12 Jun 1888; Warsaw	3 Jan 1920; Lviv
Stanisław Jaśkowski		22 Apr 1906; Warsaw	16 Nov 1965; Warsaw
Mark Kac		3 Aug 1914; Kremenets	25 Oct 1984; Los Angeles
Stefan Kaczmarz		20 Mar 1895; Sambir	Sep 1939; Poland
Andrzej Kapiszewski		8 Sep 1948; Kraków	5 May 2007; Kraków
Marek Karpinski		25 Mar 1948	
Dawid Kielak			
Bronisław Knaster		22 May 1893; Warsaw	3 Nov 1980; Wrocław
Adam Adamandy Kochański		5 Aug 1631; Dobrzyń nad Wisłą	17 May 1700; Teplice
Sławomir Kołodziej		12 Mar 1961; Bielsko-Biała	
Stanisław Krajewski		1950; Warsaw	
Anna Zofia Krygowska		19 Sep 1904; Lviv	16 May 1988; Kraków
Zdzisław Krygowski		22 Dec 1872; Lviv	10 Aug 1955; Poznań
Adrian Krzyżanowski		8 Sep 1788, 7 Sep 1788; Dębowo	21 Aug 1852; Warsaw
Marek Kuczma		10 Oct 1935; Katowice	13 Jun 1991; Katowice
Krystyna Kuperberg		17 Jul 1944; Tarnów	
Włodzimierz Kuperberg		19 Jan 1941	
Kazimierz Kuratowski		2 Feb 1896; Warsaw	18 Jun 1980; Warsaw
Irena Lasiecka		4 Feb 1948; Warsaw	
Franciszek Leja		27 Jan 1885; Grodzisko Górne	11 Oct 1979; Kraków
Mariusz Lemańczyk		3 Feb 1958; Toruń	
Stanisław Leśniewski		30 Mar 1886; Serpukhov	13 May 1939; Warsaw
Marta Lewicka		23 Nov 1972; Gdańsk	
Izabella Łaba		1966	
Stanisław Łojasiewicz		9 Oct 1926; Warsaw	14 Nov 2002; Italy
Jerzy Łoś		22 Mar 1920; Lviv	1 Jun 1998; Warsaw
Tomasz Łuczak		13 Mar 1963; Poznań	
Jan Łukasiewicz		21 Dec 1878; Lviv	13 Feb 1956; Dublin
Zbigniew Marciniak		9 Apr 1952; Warsaw	
Józef Marcinkiewicz		30 Mar 1910; Cimoszka	1940; Kharkiv
Edward Marczewski		15 Nov 1907; Warsaw	17 Oct 1976; Wrocław
Stefan Mazurkiewicz		25 Sep 1888; Warsaw	19 Jun 1945; Grodzisk Mazowiecki
Jan Mikusiński		3 Apr 1913; Ivano-Frankivsk	27 Jul 1987; Katowice
Witold Milewski		1817; Poznań	1889; Poznań
Michał Misiurewicz		9 Nov 1948; Warsaw	
Andrzej Mostowski		1 Nov 1913; Lviv	22 Aug 1975; Vancouver
Jan Mycielski		7 Feb 1932; Wiśniowa	18 Jan 2025; Boulder
Edward Neuman		19 Sep 1943; Rydułtowy	
Jerzy Neyman		16 Apr 1894; Bender	5 Aug 1981; Oakland
Otto M. Nikodym		13 Aug 1887; Zabolotiv	4 May 1974; Utica
Andrzej S. Nowak		29 Oct 1952; Żagań	
Andrew M. Odlyzko		23 Jul 1949; Tarnów	
Czesław Olech		22 May 1931; Pińczów	1 Jul 2015; Warsaw
Janusz Onyszkiewicz		18 Dec 1937; Lviv	
Władysław Orlicz		24 May 1903; Okocim	9 Aug 1990; Poznań
Zdzisław Pawlak		10 Nov 1926; Łódź	7 Apr 2006; Warsaw
Marcin Odlanicki Poczobutt		30 Oct 1728; Salomienka	8 Feb 1810; Daugavpils
Emil Leon Post		11 Feb 1897; Augustów	21 Apr 1954; New York City
Przemysław Prusinkiewicz		1952	
Józef Przytycki		14 Oct 1953; Warsaw	
Stanisław Radziszowski		7 Jun 1953; Gdańsk	
Maksym Radziwill		24 Feb 1988; Moscow	
Aleksander Rajchman		13 Nov 1890; Warsaw	7 Jun 1940; Sachsenhausen concentration camp
Jan Rajewski		14 May 1857	1906; Lviv
Marian Rejewski		16 Aug 1905; Bydgoszcz	13 Feb 1980; Warsaw
Helena Rasiowa		20 Jun 1917; Vienna	9 Aug 1994; Warsaw
Jerzy Różycki		24 Jul 1909; Vilshana	9 Jan 1942; Mediterranean Sea
Jan Rusinek		2 Dec 1950; Kraków	
Andrzej Piotr Ruszczyński		29 Jul 1951; Częstochowa	
Czesław Ryll-Nardzewski		7 Oct 1926; Vilnius	18 Sep 2015; Wrocław
Stanisław Saks		30 Dec 1897; Kalisz	23 Nov 1942; Warsaw
Wojciech Samotij		1983; Wrocław	
Juliusz Schauder		21 Sep 1899; Lviv	1943; Lviv
Marcin Schroeder		10 Jan 1953; Wrocław	
Wacław Sierpiński		14 Mar 1882; Warsaw	21 Oct 1969; Warsaw
Roman Sikorski		11 Jul 1920; Mszczonów	12 Sep 1983; Warsaw
Zdzisław Skupień		27 Nov 1938	1 Jan 2025
Agata Smoktunowicz		12 Oct 1973; Warsaw	
Joachim Stegmann		1595; Neuruppin	1633; Cluj-Napoca
Hugo Steinhaus		14 Jan 1887; Jasło	25 Feb 1972; Wrocław
Włodzimierz Stożek		23 Jul 1883; Velyki Mosty	4 Jul 1941; Lviv
Zofia Szmydt		29 Jul 1923; Warsaw	26 Nov 2010; Warsaw
Edyta Szymańska		8 Dec 1970	18 Mar 2015
Władysław Ślebodziński		6 Feb 1884; Pysznica	3 Jan 1972; Wrocław
Jan Śniadecki		29 Aug 1756; Żnin	9 Nov 1830, 21 Nov 1830; Jašiūnai
Alfred Tarski		14 Jan 1901; Warsaw	26 Oct 1983; Berkeley
Nicole Tomczak-Jaegermann		8 Jun 1945; Paris	17 Jun 2022; Edmonton
Andrzej Trybulec		29 Jan 1941; Kraków	11 Sep 2013; Białystok
Stanisław Trybuła		2 Jan 1932; Rafalivka	7 Jan 2008; Wrocław
Stanisław Ulam		13 Apr 1909; Lviv	13 May 1984; Santa Fe
Kazimierz Urbanik		5 Feb 1930; Kremenets	29 May 2005; Wrocław
Arnold Walfisz		2 Jul 1892; Warsaw	29 May 1962; Tbilisi
Mieczysław Warmus		1 Jun 1918	20 Sep 2007; Australia
Tadeusz Ważewski		24 Sep 1896; Horishnia Vyhnanka	5 Sep 1972; Rabka-Zdrój
Jan Węglarz		1947; Poznań	
Witold Wilkosz		14 Aug 1891; Kraków	31 Mar 1941; Kraków
Vitello		1230	1275; Abbaye de Vicogne
Józef Maria Hoene-Wroński		23 Aug 1776; Wolsztyn	9 Aug 1853; Paris
Ignacy Zaborowski		2 Nov 1754	10 Jan 1803; Warsaw
Władysław Zajączkowski		12 Apr 1837; Strzyżów	8 Oct 1898, 7 Oct 1898; Lviv
Kazimierz Zarankiewicz		2 May 1902; Częstochowa	5 Sep 1959; London
Stanisław Zaremba		3 Oct 1863; Romanivka	23 Nov 1942; Kraków
Stanisław Krystyn Zaremba		1903; Kraków	1990; Aberystwyth
Olgierd Zienkiewicz		18 May 1921; Caterham	2 Jan 2009; Swansea
Maciej Zworski		8 Oct 1963; Wrocław	
Henryk Zygalski		15 Jul 1908; Poznań	30 Aug 1978; Liss
Antoni Zygmund		26 Dec 1900; Warsaw	30 May 1992; Chicago
Teofil Żebrawski		5 Apr 1800; Wojnicz	5 Feb 1887; Kraków
Wiesław Żelazko		16 Feb 1933; Łódź	
Kazimierz Żorawski		22 Jun 1866; Szczurzyn	23 Jan 1953; Warsaw
Wawrzyniec Żmurko		10 Jul 1824; Yavoriv	3 Apr 1889; Lviv
