= Andrzej Pliś =

Polish mathematician

Andrzej Pliś (March 17, 1929 – November 28, 1991) was a Polish mathematician, specializing in differential equations and optimal control theory.

== Education and career ==
Pliś received his undergraduate degree from the Jagiellonian University, where he studied from 1947 to 1951. He received his PhD from the Mathematical Institute of the Polish Academy of Sciences, where his thesis advisor was Tadeusz Ważewski. Pliś did research and taught at both the Jagiellonian University and the Mathematical Institute of the Polish Academy of Sciences. He was promoted in 1961 to associate professor and in 1966 to full professor. In 1961 he was elected a member of the Polish Academy of Sciences. In 1962 he was an Invited Speaker at the International Congress of Mathematicians in Stockholm.

Pliś published about 60 research papers. Perhaps his two most famous papers are The problem of uniqueness for the solution of a system of partial differential equations (1954) and A smooth linear elliptic differential equation without any solution in a sphere (1961). His paper Characteristics of nonlinear partial differential equations (1954) gave an elegant solution to an unsolved problem which Alfréd Haar worked on in 1929. Another noteworthy paper by Pliś is On a topological method for studying the behaviour of the integrals of ordinary differential equations (1954).

== Selected publications ==
- Pliś,, A. (1954). "The problem of uniqueness for the solution of a system of partial differential equations". Bull. Acad. Polon. Sci. Cl. III (2): 55–57.
- Pliś,, A. (1954). "On a topological method for studying the behaviour of the integrals of ordinary differential equations". Bull. Acad. Polon. Sci. Cl. III (2): 415–418.
- Pliś, A. (1954). "Characteristics of nonlinear partial differential equations". Bull. Acad. Polon. Sci. Cl. III (2): 419–422.
- Plis, A. (1959). Non-uniqueness in Cauchy's Problem. Air Force Office of Scientific Research Technical Note 59-1034, Project 47500. Mathematics Division, Office of Scientific Research, U. S. Air Force.
- Pliś, A. (1960). "Non-uniqueness in Cauchy's Problem for Differential Equations of Elliptic Type". Journal of Mathematics and Mechanics. 9 (4): 557–562. JSTOR 24900954.
- Pliś, A. (1961). "A smooth linear elliptic differential equation without any solution in a sphere". Communications on Pure and Applied Mathematics. 14 (3): 599–617. doi:10.1002/cpa.3160140331.
- Pliś, Andrzej (1964). "On sets filled by asymptotic solutions of differential equations" (PDF). Annales de l'Institut Fourier. 14 (1): 191–194. doi:10.5802/aif.169.
- Olech, C.; Pliś, A. (1967). "Monotonicity assumption in uniqueness criteria for differential equations" (PDF). Colloquium Mathematicum. 18 (1). Institute of Mathematics, Polish Academy of Sciences: 43–58. doi:10.4064/cm-18-1-43-58.
- Kowalski, Z.; Pliś, A. (1972). "Difference inequalities of the elliptic type" (PDF). Annales Polonici Mathematici. 26 (3). Institute of Mathematics Polish Academy of Sciences: 239–251. doi:10.4064/ap-26-3-239-251.
- Pliś, A. (1975). "Accessible Sets in Control Theory". International Conference on Differential Equations. pp. 646–650. doi:10.1016/B978-0-12-059650-8.50052-1. ISBN 9780120596508.
- Pliś, A. (1981). "Path Integrals and Partial Differential Equations". Recent Advances in Differential Equations. pp. 373–378. doi:10.1016/B978-0-12-186280-0.50031-1. ISBN 9780121862800.
- Łojasiewicz, S.; Pliś, A.; Suarez, R. (1985). "Necessary conditions for a nonlinear control system". Journal of Differential Equations. 59 (2): 257–265. Bibcode:1985JDE....59..257L. doi:10.1016/0022-0396(85)90157-3.
- Pliś, Andrzej; Zastawniak, Tomasz (1992). "Relativistic quantum mechanics for two interacting particles in one-time representation". Reports on Mathematical Physics. 31 (3): 317–327. Bibcode:1992RpMP...31..317P. doi:10.1016/0034-4877(92)90022-S. ISSN 0034-4877.
