= Sławomir Kołodziej =

Polish mathematician (born 1961)

- Born: 12 March 1961 (age 65); Bielsko-Biała, Poland
- Education: Jagiellonian University
- Known for: complex analysis, theoretical mathematics
- Awards: Bergman Prize (2014); Zaremba Prize (1998)
- Scientific career
- Fields: Mathematics
- Workplaces: Jagiellonian University
- Doctoral students: Rafał Czyż; Sławomir Dinew

Sławomir Kołodziej (Polish: [swaˈvɔmir kɔˈwɔd͡ʑɛj]; born 12 March 1961 in Bielsko-Biała) is a Polish mathematician and Professor at the Faculty of Mathematics and Computer Science of the Jagiellonian University in Kraków. His research interests include complex analysis and theoretical mathematics including Monge–Ampère equation and plurisubharmonic functions.

== Life and career ==
He graduated in mathematics from the Jagiellonian University and continued his scientific career there obtaining his doctoral degree written under the supervision of Józef Siciak in 1989. He further received his habilitation in 1998 and the title of professor in 2005. He assumed the chair of Mathematical Analysis at the Institute of Mathematics and Computer Science of the Jagiellonian University. His doctoral students include Rafał Czyż and Sławomir Dinew.

He published his scientific papers in such journals as Acta Mathematica, Proceedings of the American Mathematical Society, Indiana University Mathematics Journal, Michigan Mathematical Journal, Mathematische Zeitschrift and Advances in Mathematics. He serves as editor-in-chief of the Annales Polonici Mathematici. He is a member of the Polish Mathematical Society (PTM), having served as the organization's deputy director between 2014–2016.

== Awards ==
In 1998, he was awarded the Stanisław Zaremba Prize of the Polish Mathematical Society. In 2014, he became the joint recipient of the Stefan Bergman Prize of the American Mathematical Society, together with Takeo Oshawa, "for his seminal contributions to the complex Monge-Ampère equation and pluripotential theory, including necessary and sufficient conditions for the existence of bounded solutions, stability, and other sharp estimates."

== See also ==
- List of Polish mathematicians
- Complex analysis
- Theoretical mathematics
