= Witold Roter =

Polish mathematician (1932–2015)

Witold Kazimier Roter
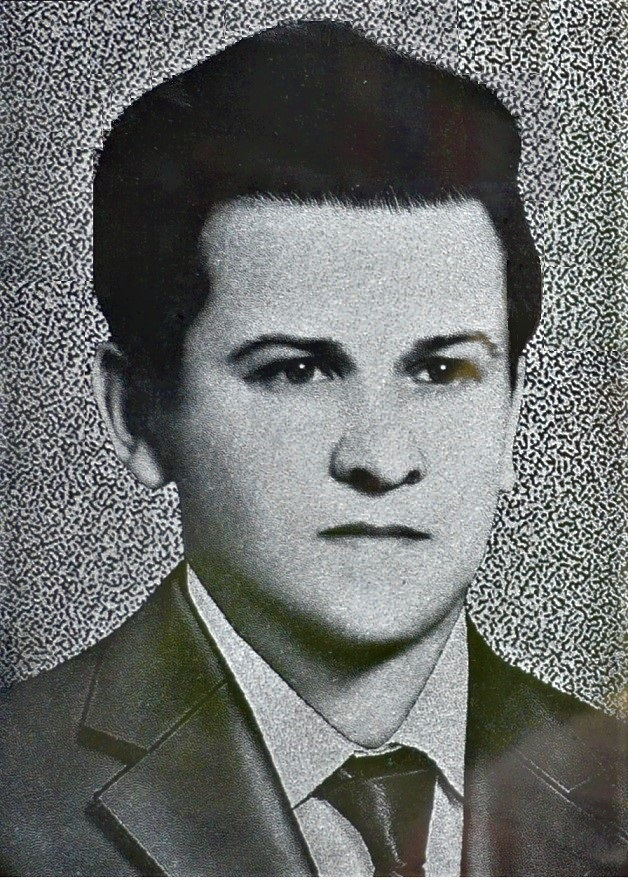
- Born: September 20, 1932; Poland
- Died: June 19, 2015 (aged 82); Wrocław, Poland
- Education: Wrocław University
- Known for: Differential Geometry
- Awards: Order of Polonia Restituta Fifth Class Gold Cross of Merit
- Scientific career
- Fields: Mathematics
- Workplaces: Wrocław University of Technology
- Doctoral advisor: Władysław Ślebodziński
- Doctoral students: Ryszard Deszcz

Witold Kazimierz Roter (September 20, 1932 – June 19, 2015, in Wrocław.) was a mathematician, of the Polish School of Mathematics, expert in differential geometry.

== Early life and education ==
Witold Kazimierz Roter was born on September 20, 1932, in Zabrze-Pawłów. He attended primary and then secondary school in Zabrze, and next, he studied mathematics at the University of Wrocław – 1st degree studies in 1950–1953 and 2nd degree studies (extramural) in 1955–1958. In 1958 he obtained a master's degree in mathematics. In 1953, after completing the first cycle of studies, he was ordered to work as a teacher at the Nowa Ruda Primary School No. 1 and in the Secondary School. He worked there until 1961. In the same year, he was accepted as a senior assistant at the Faculty of Mathematics, Physics and Chemistry of the University of Wrocław.

Witold Kazimierz Roter died on June 19, 2015, in Wrocław. He is buried at Osobowice Cemetery in Wrocław

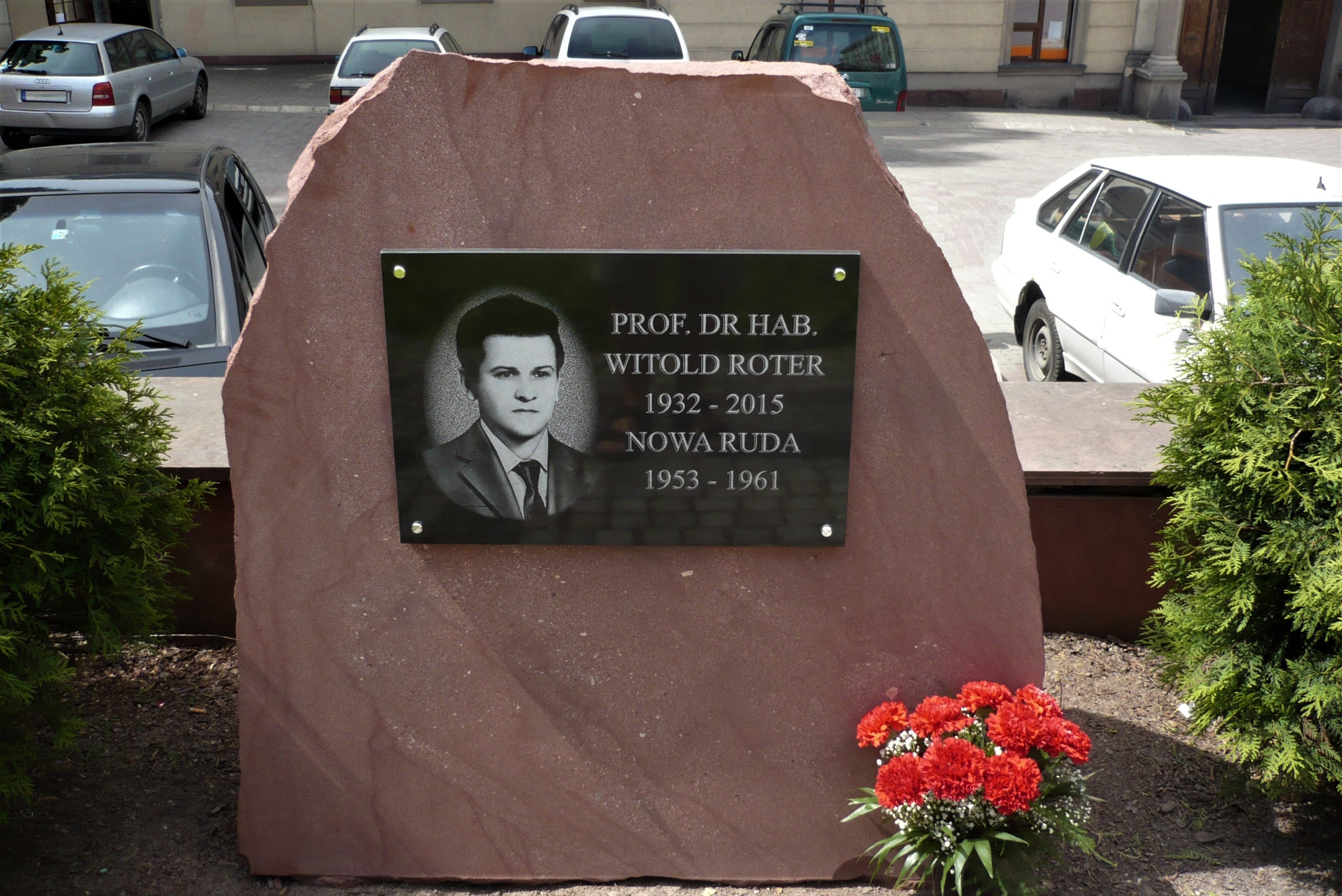
Witold Roter. A stone pillar in Nowa Ruda

== Academic career ==
In 1963 at the Wrocław University he defended his doctoral thesis "On certain properties of recursive and weak-recursive spaces" written under the supervision of Władysław Ślebodziński, and in 1974 he obtained his habilitation. He was awarded the title of professor of mathematical sciences in 1992. He was an employee of the Mathematical Institute of the University of Wrocław, where he was deputy director of the Mathematical Institute, vice-dean of the Faculty of Mathematics, Physics and Chemistry, and for many years he headed the Department of Geometry, and the Institute of Mathematics of the Wrocław University of Technology.

In the years 1989–1991 he was the president of the Wrocław Branch of Polish Mathematical Society, and in the years 1996–2004 the president of the Scholarship Foundation of Wrocław Mathematicians.

== Contributions ==
Andrzej Derdiński writes about his contribution to the development of differential geometry. Since 1961 he published more than 36 scientific papers. A summary of his most important works can be found in Mathematical Reviews and Zentralblatt fur Mathematik.

== Honors and awards ==
He was awarded the Gold Cross of Merit and the Knight's Cross of the Order of Polonia Restituta. In 1983 he was awarded the Tadeusz Ważewski Prize

June 2, 2017, at the Secondary School im. Henryk Sienkiewicz in Nowa Ruda, a plaque dedicated to the professor was unveiled, and an obelisk with a commemorative plaque was unveiled in the square at the Market Square, which was named after Roter.
