= Hospod =

Hospod is a Polish surname, from the Proto-Slavic gospodь, meaning "lord, host". The Old Polish word gospodzin means "lord, landlord". The name originated in Leżajsk County of the Subcarpathian Voivodship, (specifically, the village of Grodzisko Górne). Its first recorded use was in the late 17th Century in what was then Przemyśl Land. Historically, the village of Grodzisko Górne was located in the Ruthenian Voivodeship of the Crown of the Kingdom of Poland, where Ukrainian and Rusyn were spoken in addition to Polish, which influenced the spelling and pronunciation of the name to reflect the Ukrainian and Rusyn usage of the letter 'H' (Г) in place of the letter "G", such as with the term господар (hospodar), meaning "proprietor," "landlord," or "head of household."

== List of persons with the surname Hospod ==
- Józef Alojzy Hospod (1861–1935), Early member and activist within the Polish Peasant Party.
