= Kraków School of Mathematics =

Research collective

The Kraków School of Mathematics (Polish: krakowska szkoła matematyczna) was a subgroup of the Polish School of Mathematics represented by mathematicians from the Kraków universities—Jagiellonian University, and the Mining Academy (now AGH University of Krakow)–active during the interwar period (1918–1939). Their areas of study were primarily classical analysis, differential equations, and analytic functions.

The Kraków School of Differential Equations was founded by Tadeusz Ważewski, a student of Stanisław Zaremba, and was internationally appreciated after World War II.

The Kraków School of Analytic Functions was founded by Franciszek Leja. Other notable members included Kazimierz Żorawski, Władysław Ślebodziński, Stanisław Gołąb, and Czesław Olech.

== See also ==
- Polish School of Mathematics
- Lwów School of Mathematics
- Warsaw School of Mathematics
- Polish Mathematical Society
- Kraków School of Mathematics and Astrology
