= Stanisław Zaremba (mathematician) =

Polish mathematician and engineer (1863–1942)

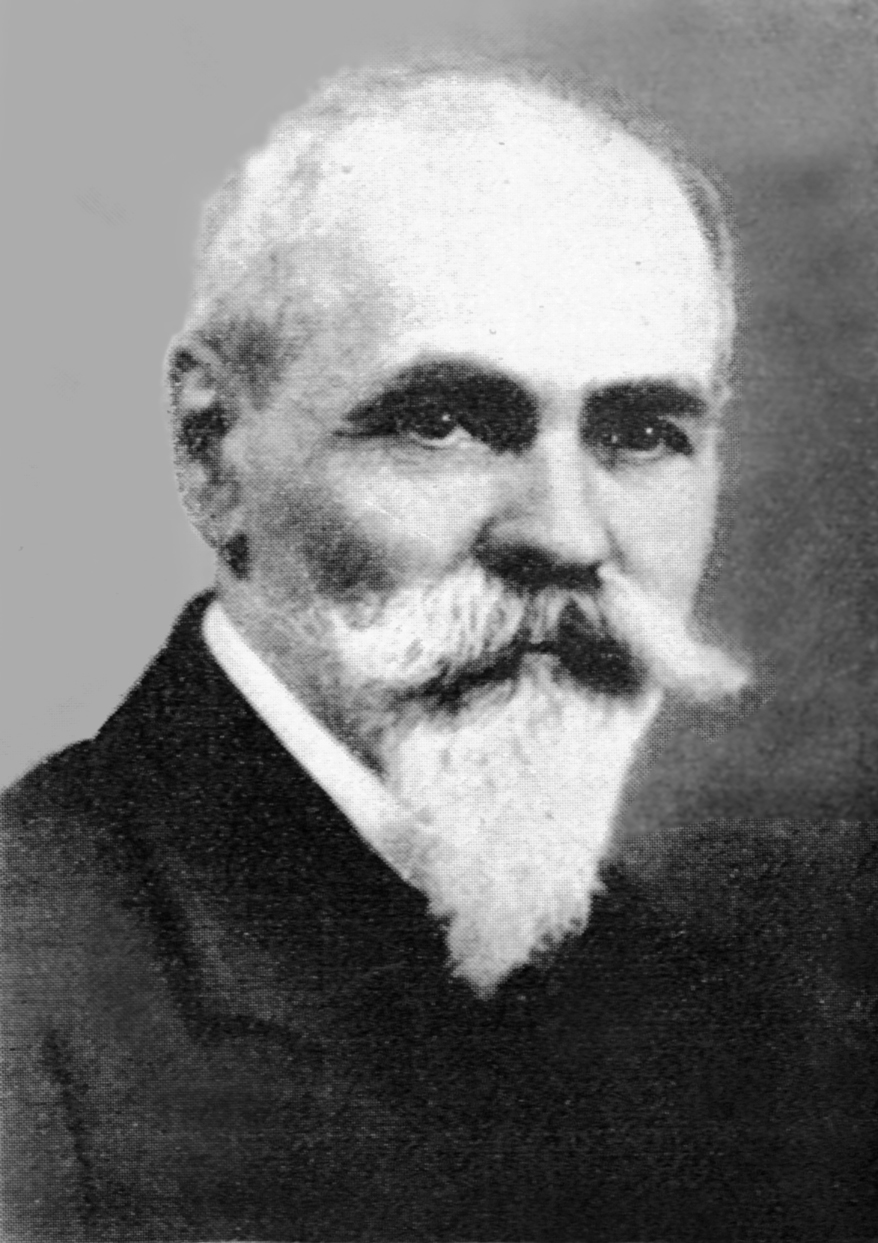
- Stanisław Zaremba
- Born: 3 October 1863; Romanówka, Trembowla, Galicia, Austria-Hungary (present-day Ukraine)
- Died: 23 November 1942 (aged 79); Kraków
- Education: University of Paris
- Known for: Mathematical analysis Direct method in the calculus of variations Potential theory Mixed boundary condition Zaremba-Jaumann rate of the Cauchy stress Reproducing kernel Hilbert space
- Spouse: Henriette Cauvin
- Scientific career
- Fields: Mathematical analysis
- Workplaces: Jagiellonian University
- Thesis: Sur un problème concernant l'état calorifique d'un corps solide homogène indéfini (1889)
- Doctoral advisor: Jean Gaston Darboux; Charles Émile Picard
- Doctoral students: Stanisław Gołąb; Wacław Sierpiński; Włodzimierz Stożek; Tadeusz Ważewski

Stanisław Zaremba (3 October 1863 – 23 November 1942) was a Polish mathematician and engineer. His research in partial differential equations, applied mathematics and classical analysis, particularly on harmonic functions, gained him a wide recognition. He was one of the mathematicians who contributed to the success of the Polish School of Mathematics through his teaching and organizational skills as well as through his research. Apart from his research works, Zaremba wrote many university textbooks and monographs.

He was a professor of the Jagiellonian University (since 1900), member of Academy of Learning (since 1903), co-founder and president of the Polish Mathematical Society (1919), and the first editor of the Annales de la Société Polonaise de Mathématique.

He should not be confused with his son Stanisław Krystyn Zaremba, also a mathematician.

== Life and career ==
Zaremba was born on 3 October 1863 in Romanówka, then part of Austria-Hungary (present-day Ukraine), to Hipolit, an engineer, and Aleksandra (née Kurzańska). He was educated at a grammar school in Saint Petersburg and studied at the Institute of Technology of the same city obtaining his diploma in engineering in 1886.

The same year he left Saint Petersburg and went to Paris to study mathematics. He received his doctoral degree from the Sorbonne in 1889 based on his dissertation Sur un probleme concernant l'etat calorifique d'un corps solide homogene indefini written under the supervision of Gaston Darboux and Émile Picard.

During his stay in France, Zaremba established close scientific contacts with Paul Painlevé and Édouard Goursat. Another French mathematician, Jacques Hadamard, observed that Zaremba's work enabled overcoming difficulties that mathematicians had been struggling with for years. The generalizations introduced by Zaremba reshaped the foundations of potential theory and other areas of mathematical physics, becoming the starting point for intensive work by a new generation of mathematicians on hyperbolic equations, the Dirichlet problem, and harmonic functions.

He left France in 1900 and joined the faculty at the Jagiellonian University in Kraków taking over the chair of mathematics. His years in France enabled him to establish a strong bridge between Polish mathematicians and those in France. In 1905, Zaremba was awarded the title of full professor by the Jagiellonian University.

In 1919, he was one of the founding members of the Kraków Mathematical Society, transformed the following year into the Polish Mathematical Society. According to Władysław Ślebodziński, Zaremba played a vital role in shaping the Golden Age of mathematics in Poland during the Interwar period. He is also regarded as a leading representative of the Kraków School of Mathematics.

His notable students included Stanisław Gołąb, Wacław Sierpiński, Włodzimierz Stożek, and Witold Wilkosz. Zaremba served as Vice-President of the International Mathematical Union, and was a member of the Polish Academy of Learning (1903) as well as a corresponding member of the Russian Academy of Sciences (1925).

He died on 23 November 1942 in Kraków, during the German occupation of Poland.

== Work ==
Zaremba's research was primarily centered on partial differential equations and potential theory. In addition, he made substantial contributions to mathematical physics and crystallography.

Zaremba, together with David Hilbert, introduced around 1900 the direct method in the calculus of variations, a general technique for proving the existence of minimizers of a given functional drawing on methods of functional analysis and topology.

Another notable result by Zaremba, introduced in 1907, is the reproducing kernel Hilbert space, which pertains to boundary value problems for harmonic and biharmonic functions.

In 1910, Zaremba solved the first boundary value problem involving a mixed boundary condition for the Laplace's equation.

=== Research activity ===
Zaremba's magnificent discoveries found a broad response and deep appreciation in the world. Stanisław Zaremba is the pride of Polish science. At the same time, by his pioneering activity in such an important field as mathematical analysis, he became one of the creators of modern Polish mathematics.

— Kazimierz Kuratowski, (Kuratowski 1980, p. 183).

== Recognition ==
In 1908, Zaremba became the first Polish mathematician to have the privilege of giving an invited talk at the International Congress of Mathematicians in Rome. He is among the most frequently invited mathematicians to this conference, having received this honour five times.

In 1925, he was awarded the Commander's Cross of the Order of Polonia Restituta. Three years later, he was decorated with the French Legion of Honour. In 1936, he received the Gold Cross of Merit. Zaremba also received honorary doctorates from University of Aix-Marseille, Jagiellonian University and the Adam Mickiewicz University in Poznań.

In 1982, the Polish Post issued a 5-zloty commemorative stamp featuring Zaremba as part of the "Polish Mathematicians" series.

== Selected publication ==
- — (1907). Zarys pierwszych zasad teoryi liczb całkowitych (in Polish). Kraków: Akademia Umiejętności. OCLC 69628334.
- — (1909). Pogląd na historyę rozwoju i stan obecny teoryi równań fizyki w czterech odczytach (in Polish). Warsaw: Druk. J. Sikorskiego. OCLC 69346520.
- — (1909). Teorya wyznaczników i równań liniowych (in Polish). Kraków: Kółko Matematyczno-Fizyczne Uczniów Uniwersytetu Jagiellońskiego. OCLC 69616537.
- — (1909), "Sur l'unicité de la solution du problème de Dirichlet", Bulletin International de l'Académie des Sciences de Cracovie. Classe des Sciences Mathématiques et Naturelles, Serie A: Sciences mathématiques (in French): 561–563, JFM 40.0452.02
- — (1910), "Sur un problème mixte relatif à l' équation de Laplace", Bulletin International de l'Académie des Sciences de Cracovie. Classe des Sciences Mathématiques et Naturelles, Serie A: Sciences mathématiques (in French): 313–344, JFM 41.0854.12, translated in Russian as Zaremba, S. (1946), Об одной смешанной задаче, относящейся к уравнению Лапласа, Uspekhi Matematicheskikh Nauk (in Russian), 1 (3–4(13–14)): 125–146, MR 0025032, Zbl 0061.23010.
- — (1912). Arytmetyka teoretyczna (in Polish). Kraków: Akademia Umiejętności. OCLC 69511091.
- — (1914). Ogólne zasady analizy matematycznej. Cz. 2: Rachunek całkowy (in Polish). Kraków: Kółko Matematyczno-Fizyczne Uczniów Uniwersytetu Jagiellońskiego.
- — (1915). Wstęp do analizy. Cz. 1: Pojęcie dowodu matematycznego oraz inne wiadomości pomocnicze (in Polish). Warsaw: skł. gł. w Księgarni Gebethnera i Wolffa. OCLC 69586726.
- — (1918). Wstęp do analizy. Cz. 2: Teorya liczb rzeczywistych (in Polish). Warsaw: skł. gł. w Księgarni Gebethnera i Wolffa. OCLC 69586727.
- — (1933). Zarys mechaniki teoretycznej. Tom 1: Wiadomości pomocnicze i kinematyka (in Polish). Kraków: Akademia Umiejętności. OCLC 69538136.

== See also ==
- Kraków School of Mathematics
- Mixed boundary condition
- List of Polish mathematicians
