= Kraków School of Mathematics and Astrology =

Astrological organization in Poland

The Kraków School of Mathematics and Astrology (Polish: krakowska szkoła matematyczna i astrologiczna) was an influential mid-to-late-15th-century group of mathematicians and astrologers at the University of Kraków (later Jagiellonian University).

== Notable members ==
- Jan of Głogów (1445–1507), author of widely recognized mathematical and astrological tracts
- Marcin Biem (1470–1540), contributor to the Gregorian calendar
- Marcin Bylica of Olkusz (1433–93), later court astrologer to King Matthias Corvinus of Hungary
- Albert Brudzewski (1446–1495), teacher to notable scholars active at European universities
- Marcin Król of Żurawica (1422–1460)
- Nicolaus Copernicus (1473–1543), student at Kraków in 1491–95

== See also ==
- Kraków School of Mathematics
- Polish School of Mathematics
