= Franciszek Leja =

Polish mathematician (1885–1979)

- Born: 27 January 1885; Grodzisko Górne, Austria-Hungary
- Died: 11 October 1979 (aged 94); Kraków, Poland
- Citizenship: Polish
- Education: University of Lviv
- Scientific career
- Fields: Mathematics
- Workplaces: Warsaw University of Technology; University of Warsaw; Jagiellonian University
- Thesis: Invariant Properties of Differential Equations with Respect to Contact Transformations (1916)
- Doctoral advisor: Kazimierz Żorawski

Franciszek Leja (Polish: [franˈt͡ɕiʂɛk ˈlɛja]; 27 January 1885 in Grodzisko Górne near Leżajsk – 11 October 1979 in Kraków, Poland) was a Polish mathematician known for his work in analytic functions and topology. He was one of the leading representatives of the Kraków School of Mathematics.

== Life and career ==
Leja was born in 1885 as the son of Jan Leja and Elżbieta (née Majkut). He grew up on a farm in the small village of Grodzisko Górne, in southeastern Poland. Between 1896‒1904, he attended a gymnasium in Jarosław. After completing his secondary education, Leja matriculated at the Department of Philosophy of the Jan Kazimierz University (now the University of Lviv in Ukraine). In 1909, he started working as a teacher of mathematics and physics in secondary schools from 1910 to 1923, including in Kraków. In 1913, Leja travelled to London, where he attended Alfred North Whitehead’s lectures.

Following the outbreak of World War I, Leja enlisted in the Polish Legions but resigned when it was required of him to swear an oath of allegiance to Austria. In 1916, he earned his doctorate at the Jagiellonian University based on the thesis entitled Własności niezmiennicze równań różniczkowych ze względu na przekształcenia stycznościowe (Invariant Properties of Differential Equations with Respect to Contact Transformations) written under the supervision of Kazimierz Żorawski. From 1924 to 1936, he was a professor at the Warsaw University of Technology and the University of Warsaw, and from 1936 to 1960 at the Jagiellonian University.

In 1919, Leja co-founded the Mathematical Society (transformed the following year into the Polish Mathematical Society). He served as its secretary from 1919 until 1921. In 1931, he became a member of the Warsaw Science Society (TNW). In 1939, he travelled to France where he delivered lectures for the French Mathematical Society.

During World War II, Leja was captured by German Nazis in the Sonderaktion Krakau operation and sent with 183 Polish professors of the Jagiellonian University and University of Technology to Sachsenhausen concentration camp. After international protest by prominent Italians including Benito Mussolini and the Vatican, 101 professors who were older than 40 were released from Sachsenhausen on February 8, 1940. Leja was not in the group of released prisoners as he was older than 40. He stayed in the concentration camp until May 1940 when he returned to Kraków. In Kraków, Leja found that the university had been closed and his apartment had been taken over by the Nazis. Homeless and with no income, he decided to move to Grodzisko Górne where he and his wife, Janina, had a small house and garden. They got a permission from Gestapo and left Kraków. In Grodzisko, Leja wrote the book on the calculus Rachunek różniczkowy i całkowy ze wstępem do równań różniczkowych.

In 1948, Leja began working for the Institute of Mathematics, which was incorporated into the Polish Academy of Sciences in 1952. In 1958, Leja was an invited speaker at the International Congress of Mathematicians organized in Edinburgh delivering a lecture titled Sur les moyennes arithmétiques, géométriques et harmoniques des distances mutuelles des points d’un ensemble. In the period of 1963–1965, Leja served as president of the Polish Mathematical Society.

His main scientific interests concentrated on analytic functions, in particular the method of extremal points and transfinite diameters. He was also interested in differential equations, interpolation theory and topology; he introduced the definition of topological group. In pluripotential theory, together with his student, Józef Karol Siciak, he introduced the Leja-Siciak extremal function.

== Works ==
- Rachunek różniczkowy i całkowy ze wstępem do równań różniczkowych, first edition in 1947, Polish Mathematical Society, 17 edition in 2008 PWN.
- Funkcje zespolone (pub. 1967, pub. 5 1979).
- Teoria funkcji analitycznych, PWN, Warszawa 1957.

== Honours ==
- Commander's Cross of the Order of Polonia Restituta (1959)
- Medal of the 10th Anniversary of People's Poland (1955)
- Officer's Cross of the Order of Polonia Restituta (1954)

== See also ==
- Kraków School of Mathematics
- List of Polish mathematicians
