= Mieczysław Warmus =

Polish mathematician and computer scientist (1932–2008)

Mieczysław Jan Warmus Professor
- Born: 1 June 1918; Dobrowlany, Poland
- Died: 20 September 2007 (aged 89); Wollongong, Australia
- Known for: Numerical analysis Computer Science
- Awards: Commander's Cross with Star

Academic background
- Education: Wrocław University
- Doctoral advisor: Hugo Steinhaus

Academic work
- Discipline: Mathematics; Computer Science
- Institutions: Wollongong University
- Doctoral students: Rościsław Rabczuk
- Main interests: Computer science; Mathematics

Mieczysław Jan Warmus (born 1 June 1918 in Dobrowlany, Poland (now Дабраўляны, Беларусь); died 20 September 2007 in Wollongong, Australia). He was a Polish mathematician, a pioneer of computer science in Poland, professor, university lecturer, author of over a hundred scientific papers. He defended his PhD at Wrocław University based on dissertation Calculating Areas of Flat Surfaces Using Parallelogram Grids under Hugo Steinhaus' supervision. The habilitation thesis titled "Nomogrammable Functions" was defended on February 22, 1958. By a resolution dated May 29, 1958, the Central Qualification Committee for Scientific Workers awarded Associate Professor Dr. habil. Mieczysław Warmus the academic title of Extraordinary Professor.

Warmus died on September 20, 2007, in Wollongong, Australia. He was buried on October 2, 2007, at the Powązki Cemetery in Warsaw.
