= Łojasiewicz inequality =

Inequality from distance to a zero of a real analytic function

In real algebraic geometry, the Łojasiewicz inequality, named after Stanisław Łojasiewicz, gives an upper bound for the distance of a point to the nearest zero of a given real analytic function. Specifically, let ƒ : U → R be a real analytic function on an open set U in R^{n}, and let Z be the zero locus of ƒ. Assume that Z is not empty. Then for any compact set K in U, there exist positive constants α and C such that, for all x in K

$$\operatorname{dist}(x,Z)^\alpha \le C|f(x)|.$$

Here, $\alpha$ can be small.

The following form of this inequality is often seen in more analytic contexts: with the same assumptions on f, for every p ∈ U there is a possibly smaller open neighborhood W of p and constants θ ∈ (0,1) and c > 0 such that

$$|f(x)-f(p)|^\theta\le c|\nabla f(x)|.$$

The proof for the one-dimensional case uses the order of vanishing: if f(x) − f(p) = (x − p)^{k} · g(x) with g(p) ≠ 0, then θ = (k − 1)/k works for k ≥ 2, and θ = 1/2 works for k = 1.

== Polyak inequality ==
A special case of the Łojasiewicz inequality, due to Polyak (see condition C in), is commonly used to prove linear convergence of gradient descent algorithms. This section is based on Karimi, Nutini & Schmidt (2016) and Liu, Zhu & Belkin (2022).

=== Definitions ===
$f$ is a function of type $\R^d \to \R$, and has a continuous derivative $\nabla f$.

$X^*$ is the subset of $\R^d$ on which $f$ achieves its global minimum (if one exists). Throughout this section we assume such a global minimum value $f^*$ exists, unless otherwise stated. The optimization objective is to find some point $x$ in $X^*$.

$\mu, L > 0$ are constants.

$\nabla f$ is $L$-Lipschitz continuous if

$$\|\nabla f(x) - \nabla f(y)\| \leq L \|x - y\|, \quad \forall x, y$$

$f$ is $\mu$-strongly convex iff
$$f(y)\ge f(x)+\nabla f(x)^T(y-x)+\frac{\mu}{2}\lVert y-x \rVert^2  \quad \forall x, y$$

$f$ is $\mu$-PL (where "PL" means "Polyak-Łojasiewicz") iff
$$\frac{1}{2}\|\nabla f(x)\|^2 \geq \mu\left(f(x)-f(x^*)\right), \quad \forall x$$

=== Basic properties ===
Theorem—1. If $f$ is $\mu$-PL, then it is invex.

2. If $\nabla f$ is L-Lipschitz continuous, then
$$f(y) \leq f(x)+\langle\nabla f(x), y-x\rangle+\frac{L}{2}\|y-x\|^2$$

3. If $f$ is $\mu$-strongly convex then it is $\mu$-PL.

4. If $g$ is $\mu$-strongly convex, and $A$ is linear, then $f := g \circ A$ is $(\mu \sigma^2)$-PL, where $\sigma$ is the smallest nonzero singular value of $A$.

5. (quadratic growth) If $f$ is $\mu$ -PL, $x$ is a point, and $x^*$ is the point on the optimum set that is closest to $x$ in L2-norm, then
$$f(x) \geq f\left(x^*\right) + \frac{\mu}{2}\left\|x-x^*\right\|_2^2$$

Proof
Proof

1. By definition, every stationary point is a global minimum.

2. Set $g(t)=f(x + t(y-x))$ for $t \in [0, 1]$ and use the $L$ -Lipschitz continuity to show that $f(y)-f(x)=g(1)-g(0)=\int_0^1g'(t)= \langle \int_0^1\nabla f(x+t(y-x))dt,y-x\rangle\leq \langle\nabla f(x), y-x\rangle+\frac{L}{2}\|y-x\|^2$.

3. By definition, $f(y)\ge f(x)+\nabla f(x)^T(y-x)+\frac{\mu}{2}\lVert y-x \rVert^2$. Now, minimize the left side, we have
$$f(x^*)\ge f(x)+\nabla f(x)^T(x^*-x)+\frac{\mu}{2}\lVert x^*-x \rVert^2$$
then minimize the right side, we have
$$f(x)+\nabla f(x)^T(x^*-x)+\frac{\mu}{2}\lVert x^*-x \rVert^2 \geq f(x) - \frac{1}{2\mu} \|\nabla f(x)\|^2$$
Combining the two, we have the $\mu$-PL inequality.

$$f\left(x_k\right)-f\left(x^*\right) \leq\left(1- \mu/ L \right)^k\left(f\left(x_0\right)-f\left(x^*\right)\right)$$

4.
$$g(Ay) \geq g(Ax) + \langle \nabla g(Ax) , Ay - Ax\rangle + \frac \mu 2 \|Ay - Ax\|^2$$

Now, since $\nabla f(x) = A^T \nabla g (Ax)$, we have
$$f(y) \geq f(x) + \langle \nabla f (x), y-x\rangle + \frac \mu 2 \|A(y - x)\|^2$$

Set $y$ to be the projection of $x$ to the optimum subspace, then we have $\|A(y - x)\| \geq \sigma \|y - x\|$. Thus, we have
$$f(y) - f(x) \geq \langle \nabla f (x), y-x\rangle + \frac{\mu \sigma^2}{2} \|y - x\|^2$$
Vary the $y$ on the right side to minimize the right side, we have the desired result.

5. Let $g(x) := \sqrt{f(x) - f^*}$. For any $x \not\in X^*$, we have
$$\nabla g(x) = \frac{\nabla f(x)}{2\sqrt{f(x) - f^*}}$$
so by $\mu$ -PL,
$$\|\nabla g(x)\|^2 \geq \mu/2$$

In particular, we see that $\nabla g$ is a vector field on $\R^d \setminus X^*$ with size at least $\sqrt{\mu / 2}$. Define a gradient flow along $\nabla g$ with constant unit velocity, starting at $x(0) = x$:
$$x(0) = x, \quad \dot x(t) = \frac{\nabla g}{\|\nabla g\|}$$

Because $g$ is bounded below by $0$, and $\|\nabla g\| \geq \sqrt{\mu/ 2}$, the gradient flow terminates on the zero set $X^*$ at a finite time
$$T \leq g(x) / \sqrt{\mu / 2}$$
The path length is $T$, since the velocity is constantly 1.

Since $x(T)$ is on the zero set, and $x^*$ is the point closest to $x$, we have
$$\|x^* - x\| \leq T \leq  g(x) / \sqrt{\mu / 2}$$
which is the desired result.

=== Gradient descent ===
Theorem (linear convergence of gradient descent)—If $f$ is $\mu$-PL and $\nabla f$ is $L$-Lipschitz, then gradient descent with constant step size $\eta$
$$x_{k+1} = x_k - \eta \nabla f(x_k)$$
converges linearly as
$$f\left(x_k\right)-f\left(x^*\right) \leq \left(1- 2\mu \eta (1 - L\eta/2)\right)^k\left(f\left(x_0\right)-f\left(x^*\right)\right),
\quad \eta \in (0, 2/L)$$

The convergence is the fastest when $\eta = 1/L$, at which point
$$f\left(x_k\right)-f\left(x^*\right) \leq\left(1- \mu/ L \right)^k\left(f\left(x_0\right)-f\left(x^*\right)\right)$$

Proof
Proof

Since $\nabla f$ is $L$ -Lipschitz, we have the parabolic upper bound
$$f(x_{k+1}) \leq f(x_k) + \langle \nabla f(x_k) , x_{k+1} - x_k\rangle + \frac{L}{2}\|x_{k+1} - x_k\|^2$$

Plugging in the gradient descent step,
$$\begin{aligned}
f(x_{k+1}) - f(x_k) &\leq \langle \nabla f(x_k) , -\eta \nabla f(x_k)\rangle + \frac{L}{2}\|- \eta \nabla f(x_k)\|^2 \\
&= (L\eta^2/2-\eta) \|\nabla f(x_k)\|^2\\
&\leq 2\mu (L\eta^2/2-\eta)\left(f(x_k)-f(x^*)\right)
\end{aligned}$$

Thus,
$$f\left(x_k\right)-f\left(x^*\right) \leq\left(1- 2\mu \eta (1 - L\eta/2)\right)^k\left(f\left(x_0\right)-f\left(x^*\right)\right)$$

Corollary—1. $x_k$ converges to the optimum set $X^*$ at a rate of $\left(1- \mu \eta (2 - L\eta)\right)$.

2. If $f$ is $\mu$ -PL, not constant, and $\nabla f$ is $L$ -Lipschitz, then $L \geq \mu$.

3. Under the same conditions, gradient descent with optimal step size (which might be found by line-searching) satisfies

$$f\left(x_k\right)-f\left(x^*\right) \leq\left(1- \mu/ L \right)^k\left(f\left(x_0\right)-f\left(x^*\right)\right)$$

=== Coordinate descent ===
The coordinate descent algorithm first samples a random coordinate $i_k$ uniformly, then perform gradient descent by
$$x_{k+1} = x_k - \eta \partial_{i_k} f(x_k) e_{i_k}$$

Theorem—Assume that $f$ is $\mu$ -PL, and that $\nabla f$ is $L$ -Lipschitz at each coordinate, meaning that
$$|\partial_{i}f(x + te_i) - \partial_i f(x)| \leq L|t|$$
Then, $\mathbb E[f(x_k) - f(x^*)]$ converges linearly for all $\eta \in (0, 2/L)$ by
$$\mathbb E[f(x_k) - f(x^*)] \leq \left(1 - \frac{\mu\eta(2 - L\eta)}{d}\right)^k (f(x_0) - f(x^*))$$

Proof
Proof

By the same argument,
$$f(x_{k+1}) \leq f(x_k) + (L\eta^2/2 - \eta) (\partial_{i_k}f(x_k))^2$$

Take expectation with respect to $i_k$, we have
$$\mathbb E[f(x_{k+1})] \leq f(x_k) + \frac{L\eta^2/2 - \eta}{d} \|\nabla f(x_k)\|^2$$

Plug in the $\mu$ -PL inequality, we have
$$\mathbb E[f(x_k) - f(x^*)] \leq \left(1 - \frac{\mu\eta(2 - L\eta)}{d}\right) (f(x_k) - f(x^*))$$
Iterating the process, we have the desired result.

=== Stochastic gradient descent ===
In stochastic gradient descent, we have a function to minimize $f(x)$, but we cannot sample its gradient directly. Instead, we sample a random gradient $\nabla f_i(x)$, where $f_i$ are such that
$$f(x) = \mathbb E_i[f_i(x)]$$
For example, in typical machine learning, $x$ are the parameters of the neural network, and $f_i(x)$ is the loss incurred on the $i$ -th training data point, while $f(x)$ is the average loss over all training data points.

The gradient update step is
$$x_{k+1} = x_k - \eta_k \nabla f_{i_k}(x_k)$$
where $\eta_k > 0$ are a sequence of learning rates (the learning rate schedule).

Theorem—If each $\nabla f_i$ is $L$ -Lipschitz, $f$ is $\mu$ -PL, and $f$ has global minimum $f^*$, then
$$\mathbb{E}\left[f\left(x_{k+1}\right)-f^*\right] \leq\left(1-2 \eta_k \mu\right)\left[f\left(x_k\right)-f^*\right]+\frac{L \eta_k^2}{2} \mathbb E_i[\|\nabla f_i(x_k) \|^2]$$
We can also write it using the variance of gradient L2 norm:
$$\mathbb{E}\left[f\left(x_{k+1}\right)-f^*\right] \leq\left(1-\mu (2\eta_k - L\eta_k^2 )\right)\left[f\left(x_k\right)-f^*\right]+\frac{L \eta_k^2}{2} \mathbb E_i[\|\nabla f_i(x_k) - \nabla f(x_k)\|^2]$$

Proof
Proof

Because all $\nabla f_i$ are $L$ -Lipschitz, so is $\nabla f$. We thus have
$$f(x_{k+1}) \leq f(x_k) - \eta_k \langle \nabla f(x_k) , \nabla f_{i_k}(x_k)\rangle + \frac{L\eta_k^2}{2} \| \nabla f_{i_k}(x_k)\|^2$$

Now, take the expectation over $i_k$, and use the fact that $f$ is $\mu$ -PL. This gives the first equation.

The second equation is shown similarly by noting that
$$\mathbb E_i[\|\nabla f_i(x_k) \|^2] = \mathbb E_i[\|\nabla f_i(x_k) - \nabla f(x_k) \|^2] + \|\nabla f(x_k) \|^2$$

As it is, the proposition is difficult to use. We can make it easier to use by some further assumptions.

The second-moment on the right can be removed by assuming a uniform upper bound. That is, if there exists some $C> 0$ such that during the SG process, we have
$$\mathbb E_i[\|\nabla f_i(x_k)\|^2] \leq C$$
for all $k = 0, 1, \dots$, then
$$\mathbb{E}\left[f\left(x_{k+1}\right)-f^*\right] \leq\left(1-2 \eta_k \mu\right)\left[f\left(x_k\right)-f^*\right]+\frac{LC \eta_k^2}{2}$$
Similarly, if
$$\forall k, \quad \mathbb E_i[\|\nabla f_i(x_k) - \nabla f(x_k)\|^2]\leq C$$
then
$$\mathbb{E}\left[f\left(x_{k+1}\right)-f^*\right] \leq\left(1-\mu (2\eta_k - L\eta_k^2 )\right)\left[f\left(x_k\right)-f^*\right]+\frac{L C\eta_k^2}{2}$$

==== Learning rate schedules ====
For constant learning rate schedule, with $\eta_k = \eta = 1/L$, we have
$$\mathbb{E}\left[f\left(x_{k+1}\right)-f^*\right] \leq\left(1-\mu/L\right)\left[f\left(x_k\right)-f^*\right]+\frac{C}{2L}$$
By induction, we have
$$\mathbb{E}\left[f\left(x_{k}\right)-f^*\right] \leq\left(1-\mu/L\right)^k \left[f\left(x_0\right)-f^*\right]+\frac{C}{2\mu}$$
We see that the loss decreases in expectation first exponentially, but then stops decreasing, which is caused by the $C/(2L)$ term. In short, because the gradient descent steps are too large, the variance in the stochastic gradient starts to dominate, and $x_k$ starts doing a random walk in the vicinity of $X^*$.

For decreasing learning rate schedule with $\eta_k = O(1/k)$, we have $\mathbb{E}\left[f\left(x_{k}\right)-f^*\right] = O(1/k)$.
