= Stanisław Krystyn Zaremba =

Polish mathematician (1903–1990)

- Born: 15 August 1903; Kraków, Kingdom of Galicia and Lodomeria
- Died: 14 January 1990 (aged 86); Aberystwyth, United Kingdom
- Education: Jagiellonian University
- Known for: Hlawka–Zaremba formula Zaremba's conjecture
- Scientific career
- Fields: mathematics low-discrepancy sequence
- Workplaces: Vilnius University

Stanisław Krystyn Zaremba (August 15, 1903, in Cracow – January 14, 1990, in Aberystwyth, Wales) was a Polish mathematician, climber, and mountaineer. He was the son of Stanisław Zaremba (1863–1942), also a mathematician.

Zaremba is known for his contributions to low-discrepancy sequences, low-discrepancy sets of points, and their application to Quasi-Monte Carlo methods for numerical integration. He is one of the namesakes of the Hlawka–Zaremba formula in the theory of low-discrepancy sequences.

== Education and career ==
Zaremba studied mathematics at the Jagiellonian University (1921–1924, 1926–1929) and in Paris (1924–26). After his studies he was an assistant at Vilnius University and since 1936 he was an associate professor at Jagiellonian University. He then worked as a lecturer in Stalinabad (nowadays Dushanbe in Tajikistan), England, Wales, United States and Canada, eventually settling in Wales, where he died in 1990. He visited Poland well into his old age, lecturing at the Jagiellonian University in 1981.

== Mountaineering ==
Zaremba was an active climber in the years 1925–1927, especially during the winter. He is the author of many first ascents in the Tatra Mountains. The new routes in the summer were, among others, on Little Kozi Wierch, Wieliczka Peak, Frog Turtle Muster, Mięguszowiecki Peak, Durny Peak. In winter he made his way to Hruby Wierch, Zadni Kościelec, Jaworowy Peak. Apart from the Tatras, he also climbed in the Alps, the Pyrenees and the mountains of Lebanon, Iran, Wales and Tajikistan.

He was the editor of the magazine Taternik and an honorary member of the Polish Alpine Association.

One of the Wrocław's dwarfs (Alpinki group) is named Zarembek in his honor.

== See also ==
- List of Polish mathematicians
- Zaremba's conjecture

== Selected publications ==
- Zaremba, S. C. (1966), "Good lattice points, discrepancy, and numerical integration", Annali di Matematica Pura ed Applicata, 73: 293–317, doi:10.1007/BF02415091, MR 0218018, S2CID 123200672
- Zaremba, S. C. (1968), "The mathematical basis of Monte Carlo and quasi-Monte Carlo methods", SIAM Review, 10 (3): 303–314, Bibcode:1968SIAMR..10..303Z, doi:10.1137/1010056, MR 0233489
- Halton, J. H.; Zaremba, S. C. (1969), "The extreme and $L^{2}$ discrepancies of some plane sets", Monatsh. Math., 73 (4): 316–328, doi:10.1007/BF01298982, MR 0252329, S2CID 123387557
- Erdős, Paul; Zaremba, S. K. (1973), "The arithmetic function $\textstyle\sum_{d|n}\log d/d$", Demonstratio Mathematica, 6: 575–579 (1974), MR 0352025
