= Zofia Szmydt =

Polish mathematician (1923–2010)

- Born: July 29, 1923; Warsaw, Poland
- Died: November 26, 2010 (aged 87)
- Citizenship: Polish
- Education: Jagiellonian University
- Awards: Stefan Banach Prize
- Scientific career
- Fields: Differential equations
- Workplaces: Jagiellonian University, University of Warsaw
- Thesis: O całkach pierwszych równania różniczkowego
- Doctoral advisor: Tadeusz Ważewski

Zofia Szmydt (29 July 1923 – 26 November 2010) was a Polish mathematician working in the areas of differential equations, potential theory and the theory of distributions. She was a winner of the Stefan Banach Prize for mathematics in 1956.

== Life ==
Zofia Szmydt was born in Warsaw on 29 July 1923. Her mother, Zofia Szmydtowa (née Gąsiorowska), was a historian and philologist.

Szmydt studied at the University of Warsaw in clandestine classes during World War II. Following the Warsaw Uprising, she and her family were deported to Kraków.

In 1946, Szmydt graduated in mathematics from the Jagiellonian University. She defended her doctoral thesis in 1949, written under the direction of Tadeusz Ważewski.

Szmydt died on 27 November 2010.

== Career ==
Until 1952, Szmydt worked at the Jagiellonian University. She was a member of the Mathematical Institute of the Polish Academy of Sciences between 1949 and 1971. In 1971, she joined the University of Warsaw where she became a professor in 1984. She retired in 1993.

=== Contributions ===
In her 1951 paper, Sur l’allure asymptotique des intégrales des équations différentielles ordinaires, Szmydt applied the topological method by Ważewski to generalizations of Perron's classic results on the asymptotics of systems of solutions of ordinary differential equations.

Szmydt's work on hyperbolic differential equations Sur un problème concernant un systèmes d’équations différentielles hyperboliques d’ordre arbitraire à deux variables indépendantes (1957) proposed a generalised solution for the functional differential equation, which subsumed the Darboux, Cauchy, Picard and Goursat problems as special cases. This was in later literature referred to as the Szmydt problem.

Szmydt's textbook Fourier Transformation and Linear Differential Equations (1971) was the first on the topic to be published in the Polish language. Her motivation was to present the basics of the theory of partial differential equations with a particular emphasis on distributions in limit problems of the classical equations (the heat equation, Schrödinger equation, and the Laplace and Poisson equations).

In Paley–Wiener theorems for the Mellin transformations (1990), Szmydt gave a full characterization of the space of multipliers for Mellin's distribution in terms of the Mellin transform (equivalent to the Paley–Wiener theorem) and established relationships between Schwartz and Mellin distribution spaces.

== Honours ==
In 1956, Szmydt won the Stefan Banach Prize of the Polish Mathematical Society for her research into topological methods in nonlinear ordinary differential equations. In 1973, she awarded the Commander's Cross of the Order of Polonia Restituta for her services to mathematical education.

== Selected works ==
=== Books ===
- Topological Imbedding of Laplace Distributions in Laplace Hyperfunctions. Polish Academy of Sciences. 1998. (with Bogdan Ziemian)
- The Mellin Transformation and Fuchsian Type Partial Differential Equations. Springer. 1992. ISBN 978-0792316831. (with Bogdan Ziemian)
- Fourier Transformation and Linear Differential Equations. Springer. 1977. ISBN 978-90-277-0622-5.

=== Articles ===
- "Paley–Wiener theorems for the Mellin transformations". Ann. Polon. Math. 51. 1990.
- "Sur un problème concernant un systèmes d'équations différentielles hyperboliques d'ordre arbitraire à deux variables indépendantes". Bull. Acad. Polon. Sci. III (5). 1957.
- "Sur l'allure asymptotique des intégrales des équations différentielles ordinaires". Ann. Soc. Polon. Math. 24 (2). 1951.

== Bibliography ==
- Łysik, Grzegorz (2015). "Zofia Szmydt (1923–2010)". Wiadomości Matematyczne. 51 (2).
- Karpowicz, Adrian (2014). "The Existence of a Unique Solution of the Hyperbolic Functional Differential Equation" (PDF). Demonstratio Mathematica. XLVII (4).
- Kenney, Emelie Agnes (2017). "Making Her Mark on a Century of Turmoil and Triumph: A Tribute to Polish Women in Mathematics". In Janet L. Beery; Sarah J. Greenwald; Jacqueline A. Jensen-Vallin; Maura B. Mast (eds.). Women in Mathematics: Celebrating the Centennial of the Mathematical Association of America. Springer. ISBN 978-3-319-66694-5.
