= Marcin Schroeder =

Polish-Japanese mathematician and theoretical physicist

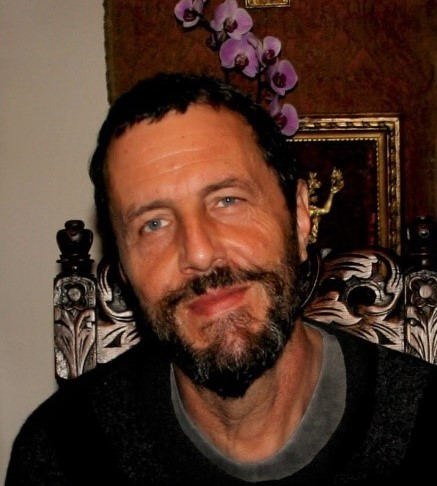
- Marcin J. Schroeder (2017)
- Born: Marcin Jan Schroeder; 10 January 1953 (age 73); Wrocław, Poland
- Education: University of Wrocław, Southern Illinois University Carbondale
- Scientific career
- Fields: Mathematics, Theoretical physics
- Workplaces: Akita International University, Minnesota State University Akita - Japan
- Doctoral advisor: Mary H. Wright
- Website: www.aiu.ac.jp/~cresi/eng/member/schroeder.html

Marcin Schroeder (born 10 January 1953 in Wrocław, Lower Silesian Voivodeship in Poland, son of Jerzy Schroeder and Irena Grudzińska) is a Polish-Japanese mathematician and theoretical physicist, currently a professor and head of basic education and dean of academic affairs at Akita International University, Japan, and President Elect of the International Society for the Study of Information (IS4SI).

== Academic career ==
Schroeder received his M.Sc. degree in theoretical physics from the University of Wrocław in 1976 and his Ph.D. in mathematics from Southern Illinois University Carbondale in 1991 under the supervision of Mary H. Wright. His dissertation was entitled "Dependence Systems." He held positions at the Institute of Theoretical Physics of the University of Wroclaw, at Southern Illinois University Carbondale, and Minnesota State University Akita - Japan. In 2003, he started work as the member of Working Group in Preparation Office of the New International University in Akita and the first Dean of Academic Affairs. The new university opened in 2004, and within a decade became a leading educational institution in Japan that set a pattern for internationalization of Japanese universities.

== Contributions ==
Schroeder has published some 50 articles on subjects from general algebra, philosophy and theory of information and computation, as well as philosophy and history of science, logic, foundations of physics and mathematics, and in mathematical formalization of scientific theories. Schroeder is known for creating a conceptual framework for the study of information with a novel mathematical, algebraic formalism for information, its integration, dynamics and computation. In cooperation with a group of researchers, including Arran Gare, Robert Root-Bernstein, Otto Rössler, and the Nobel Prize winner Brian Josephson, Schroeder is currently engaged in several long-term research initiatives in Biomathics that develop innovative formal tools for the study of life.

== Awards and honors ==
Marcin Schroeder was elected President (for the 2019 term of office) of the IS4SI (International Society for the Study of Information). Since 2015, he has also served as founding Editor-in-Chief of the scholarly journal Philosophies, published by the MDPI.

== See also ==
- Philosophy of information
- Ontology (information science)
- List of Polish mathematicians
