= Warsaw School (mathematics) =

Research collective

Warsaw School of Mathematics is the name given to a group of mathematicians who worked at Warsaw, Poland, in the two decades between the World Wars, especially in the fields of logic, set theory, point-set topology and real analysis. They published in the journal Fundamenta Mathematicae, founded in 1920—one of the world's first specialist pure-mathematics journals. It was in this journal, in 1933, that Alfred Tarski—whose illustrious career would a few years later take him to the University of California, Berkeley—published his celebrated theorem on the undefinability of the notion of truth.

Notable members of the Warsaw School of Mathematics have included:

- Wacław Sierpiński
- Kazimierz Kuratowski
- Edward Marczewski
- Bronisław Knaster
- Zygmunt Janiszewski
- Stefan Mazurkiewicz
- Stanisław Saks
- Karol Borsuk
- Roman Sikorski
- Nachman Aronszajn
- Samuel Eilenberg

Additionally, notable logicians of the Lwów–Warsaw School of Logic, working at Warsaw, have included:

- Stanisław Leśniewski
- Adolf Lindenbaum
- Alfred Tarski
- Jan Łukasiewicz
- Andrzej Mostowski
- Helena Rasiowa

Fourier analysis has been advanced at Warsaw by:

- Aleksander Rajchman
- Antoni Zygmund
- Józef Marcinkiewicz
- Otton M. Nikodym
- Jerzy Spława-Neyman

== See also ==
- Polish School of Mathematics
- Kraków School of Mathematics
- Lwów School of Mathematics
