= Olech theorem =

In dynamical systems theory, the Olech theorem establishes sufficient conditions for global asymptotic stability of a two-equation system of non-linear differential equations. The result was established by Czesław Olech in 1963, based on joint work with Philip Hartman.

== Theorem ==
The differential equations $\mathbf{\dot{x}} = f ( \mathbf{x} )$, $\mathbf{x} = [ x_1 \, x_2]^{\mathsf{T}} \in \mathbb{R}^2$, where
$$f(\mathbf{x}) = \begin{bmatrix} f^1 (\mathbf{x}) & f^2 (\mathbf{x}) \end{bmatrix}^{\mathsf{T}}$$
, for which $\mathbf{x}^\ast = \mathbf{0}$ is an equilibrium point, is uniformly globally asymptotically stable if:

(a) the trace of the Jacobian matrix is negative, $\operatorname{tr} \mathbf{J}_f (\mathbf{x}) < 0$ for all $\mathbf{x} \in \mathbb{R}^2$,
(b) the Jacobian determinant is positive, $\left| \mathbf{J}_{f} (\mathbf{x}) \right| > 0$ for all $\mathbf{x} \in \mathbb{R}^{2}$, and
(c) the system is coupled everywhere with either

$$\frac{\partial f^1}{\partial x_1} \frac{\partial f^2}{\partial x_2} \neq 0,
\text{ or } \frac{\partial f^1}{\partial x_2} \frac{\partial f^2}{\partial x_1} \neq 0 \text{ for all } \mathbf{x} \in \mathbb{R}^2.$$
