= Gradient conjecture =

In mathematics, the gradient conjecture, due to René Thom (1989), was proved in 2000 by three Polish mathematicians, Krzysztof Kurdyka (University of Savoie, France), Tadeusz Mostowski (Warsaw University, Poland) and Adam Parusiński (University of Angers, France).

The conjecture states that given a real-valued analytic function f defined on R^{n} and a trajectory x(t) of the gradient vector field of f having a limit point x_{0} ∈ R^{n}, where f has an isolated critical point at x_{0}, there exists a limit (in the projective space PR^{n−1}) for the secant lines from x(t) to x_{0}, as t tends to zero.

The proof depends on a theorem due to Stanisław Łojasiewicz.
