= Marta Lewicka =

Polish-American mathematician

- Born: 23 November 1972 (age 53); Gdańsk, Poland
- Education: University of Gdańsk; SISSA
- Scientific career
- Fields: Mathematics
- Workplaces: University of Pittsburgh
- Doctoral advisor: Alberto Bressan
- Website: sites.pitt.edu/~lewicka/

Marta Lewicka (born 23 November 1972) is a Polish-American professor of mathematics at the University of Pittsburgh, specializing in mathematical analysis. Lewicka has contributed results in the theory of hyperbolic systems of conservation laws, fluid dynamics, calculus of variations, nonlinear elasticity, nonlinear potential theory and differential games.

== Career ==
Lewicka earned bachelor's and master's degrees in mathematics in 1996 from the University of Gdańsk, and a second engineering bachelor's degree in computer science in 1998 from Częstochowa University of Technology. She completed her Ph.D. in 2000 from the International School for Advanced Studies in Trieste, Italy under the supervision of Alberto Bressan. After postdoctoral research at the Max Planck Institute for Mathematics in the Sciences in Leipzig, Germany and a term as L.E. Dickson Instructor at the University of Chicago, she joined the University of Minnesota faculty in 2005. She moved in 2010 to Rutgers University, and again in 2011 to the University of Pittsburgh.

In 2023-2024 she is the Vice Chair of the Society for Industrial and Applied Mathematics Activity Group on Analysis of Partial Differential Equations.

== Recognition ==
In 2016, she gave an AMS invited address at the AMS/MAA Joint Mathematical Meetings in the area of nonlinear elasticity and geometry of prestrained materials. In 2017, she gave a Howard Rowlee Lecture. In 2017, she received Professor's scientific title, awarded in Poland by the President of the Republic of Poland. In 2018, she received a Simons Fellowship in Mathematics.

She was elected a Fellow of the American Mathematical Society in the Class of 2021, with citation "For contributions to partial differential equations, calculus of variations, and continuum mechanics." In 2022 she was a fellow of the Lady Davis Foundation and a visiting professor at the Hebrew University of Jerusalem. She was named as a Fellow of the Association for Women in Mathematics, in the 2027 class of fellows, "for sustained leadership and impact in advancing women and girls in mathematics through mentorship, community building, and outreach initiatives".

== Books ==
- Lewicka, Marta (2020). A Course on Tug-of-War Games with Random Noise. Introduction and Basic Constructions. Universitext. Springer International Publishing. p. 263.
- Lewicka, Marta (2023). Calculus of Variations on Thin Prestressed Films. Asymptotic Methods in Elasticity. Progress in Nonlinear Differential Equations and Their Applications. Birkhäuser. p. 460.

== See also ==
- List of Polish mathematicians
