= Stanisław Łojasiewicz =

Polish mathematician (1926–2002)

- Born: 9 October 1926; Warsaw, Poland
- Died: 14 November 2002 (aged 76)
- Education: Jagiellonian University
- Known for: Łojasiewicz inequality, Łojasiewicz factorization lemma
- Scientific career
- Fields: Mathematics
- Workplaces: Jagiellonian University
- Doctoral advisor: Tadeusz Ważewski

Stanisław Łojasiewicz (Polish: [ˈwɔjaɕɛvit͡ʂ]; 9 October 1926 – 14 November 2002) was a Polish mathematician, professor at the Jagiellonian University and a member of the Polish Academy of Sciences known for his work in real algebraic geometry and theory of distributions.

== Early life and education ==
Stanisław Łojasiewicz was born in 1926 in Warsaw to father Stanisław, who served as captain in the Polish Army. In 1945, he was admitted to the Jagiellonian University. During his studies he was particularly interested in the theory of differential equations and was influenced by Tadeusz Ważewski. In 1950, he was awarded a doctorate for his work in this branch of mathematics.

== Career ==
At the end of the 1950s, Łojasiewicz solved the problem of distribution division by analytic functions, introducing the Łojasiewicz inequality. Its solution opened the road to important results in the new theory of partial differential equations. The method established by Łojasiewicz led him to advance the theory of semianalytic sets, which opened an important chapter in modern analysis.

From 1956 to 1960, Łojasiewicz taught at universities in Kingston, Chicago, Berkeley and the Institute for Advanced Studies in Princeton. In 1962, he became professor at the Jagiellonian University. In 1967-68, he worked at the Institut des Hautes Etudes Scientifiques where he produced an elegant proof of the Malgrange preparation theorem.

== Honours and awards ==
In 1970, Łojasiewicz delivered an invited address on the subject of semianalytic geometry at the International Congress of Mathematicians in Nice, France. In 1971, Łojasiewicz became a corresponding member of the Polish Academy of Sciences and in 1980, its full member.

In 1984, Łojasiewicz was awarded the Sierpiński Medal. The following year, he accepted the Jurzykowski Prize. In 1998, he became the recipient of the Order of Polonia Restituta (Commander's Cross with Star).

== Death and legacy ==
On 14 November 2002, Łojasiewicz died of heart attack when returning from a scientific conference in Italy. He was buried at the Rakowicki Cemetery in Kraków.

The Łojasiewicz Lectures are a series of annual lectures in mathematics given at the Jagiellonian University in honour of Łojasiewicz.

Year	Lecturer	University	Country	Title
2010	Shing-Tung Yau	Harvard University	China / United States	Coupled system of Hermitian metrics with Hermitian Yang-Mills system
2011	Richard S. Hamilton	Columbia University	United States	The Ricci flow in lower dimensions
2012	Bernard Malgrange	Université Henri Poincaré	France	Differential algebraic groups
2013	Neil Trudinger	Australian National University	Australia	Optimal transportation in the 21st century
2014	Fernando Codá Marquez	Princeton University	Brazil / United States	The min-max theory of minimal surfaces and applications
2015	Noga Alon	Tel Aviv University	Israel	Signrank and its applications in combinatorics and complexity
2017	Artur Avila	Instituto Nacional de Matemática Pura e Aplicada / Centre national de la recherche scientifique	Brazil / France	One-frequency Schrödinger operators and the almost reducibility conjecture
2018	Luis A. Caffarelli	University of Texas at Austin	Argentina / United States	Some models of segregation
2023	Maksym Radziwill	University of Texas at Austin	Poland / Canada / United States	Recent developments in analytic number theory
2024	László Lovász	Eötvös Loránd University	Hungary	The infinite is a good approximation of the very large finite
2025	Peter Sarnak	Princeton University	United States	The complexity of divisors of a number
2026	Tom Hutchcroft	California Institute of Technology / Princeton University	United Kingdom / United States	Dimension dependence of critical phenomena

== See also ==
- Gradient conjecture
- Real algebraic geometry
- List of Polish mathematicians
