= Tytus Babczyński =

Polish mathematician and physicist

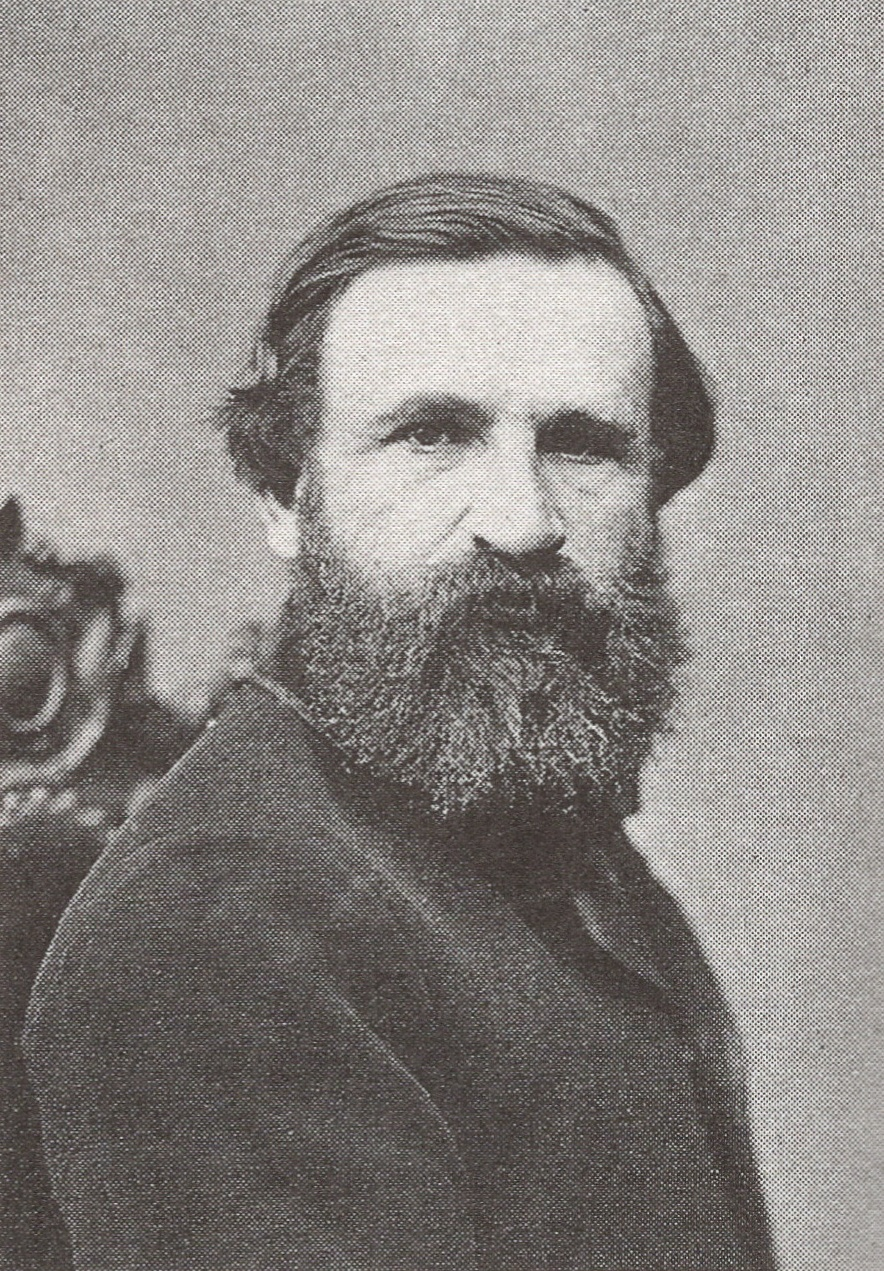
Tytus Babczyński

Titus Babczyński (1832 – 1910) was a Polish mathematician and physicist. He graduated from the School of Fine Arts in Warsaw, then studied physics and mathematics. In 1872, he was a doctor at the University of St. Petersburg. In the period (1857–1862), he was a professor of higher mathematics and mechanics at the School of Fine Arts in Warsaw and eventually the University of Warsaw (1862–1887).

== Early life ==
Babczyński was born in Warsaw on 4 January 1832. He graduated provincial school in 1847. He then entered the School of Fine Arts in Warsaw, graduating with a degree in architecture in 1850. This same year, he moved to St. Petersberg to study mathematical sciences.

== Selected works ==
- "On the phenomena of induction", master's dissertation between 1850-54
- "Course of Higher Algebra", 1864-65, 1865-66 at the Main School in Warsaw
- "Differential and Integral Calculus", 1867-68
- "Introduction to Higher Dynamics", doctoral dissertation in 1872
- "On the multiplication of symmetric algebraic, rational integer functions", Zeit. Math. Physik 17 (1872), 147–158.

== Awards and honors ==
His master's degree dissertation "On the phenomena of induction," was awarded a gold medal at the University of St. Petersburg.
