= Czesław Olech =

Polish mathematician (1931–2015)

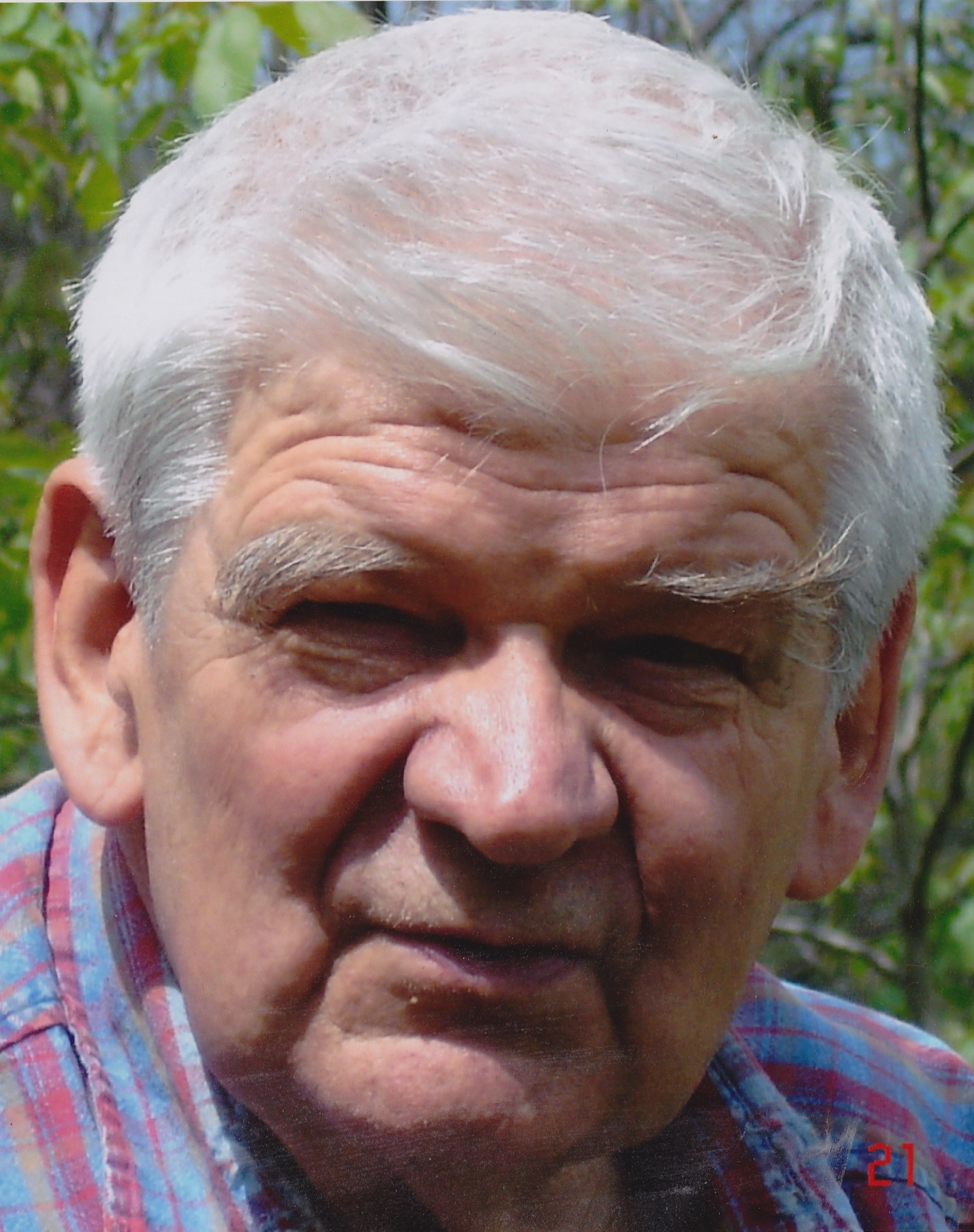
- Born: 22 May 1931; Pińczów, Poland
- Died: 1 July 2015 (aged 84)
- Education: Jagiellonian University, Kraków
- Known for: Olech theorem
- Spouse: Jadwiga Jastrzębska
- Children: Teresa (b. 1955); Anna (b. 1956); Wanda (b. 1959); Barbara (b. 1963); Janusz (b. 1963)
- Scientific career
- Fields: Mathematics
- Doctoral advisor: Tadeusz Ważewski

Czesław Olech (22 May 1931 – 1 July 2015) was a Polish mathematician. He was a representative of the Kraków school of mathematics, especially the differential equations school of Tadeusz Ważewski.

== Education and career ==
In 1954 he completed his mathematical studies at the Jagiellonian University, in Kraków obtained his doctorate at the Institute of Mathematical Sciences in 1958, habilitation in 1962, the title of associate professor in 1966, and the title of professor in 1973.

- 1970–1986: director of The Institute of Mathematics, Polish Academy of Sciences.
- 1972–1991: director of Stefan Banach International Mathematical Center in Warsaw.
- 1979–1986: member of the Executive Committee, International Mathematical Union.
- 1982–1983: president of the Organizing Committee, International Congress of Mathematicians in Warsaw,
- 1987–1989: president of the Board of Mathematics, Polish Academy of Sciences.
- 1990–2002: president of the Scientific Council, Institute of Mathematics of the Polish Academy of Sciences.

Czeslaw Olech, often as a visiting professor, was invited by the world's leading mathematical centers in the United States, USSR (later Russia), Canada and many European countries. He cooperated with Solomon Lefschetz, Sergey Nikolsky, Philip Hartman and Roberto Conti, the most distinguished mathematicians involved in the theory of differential equations. Based on joint work with Hartman, he proved the Olech theorem. Lefschetz highly valued Ważewski's school, and especially the retract method, which Olech applied by developing, among other things, control theory. He supervised nine doctoral dissertations, and reviewed a number of theses and dissertations.

== Main fields of research interest ==
- Contributions to ordinary differential equations:
  - various applications of Tadeusz Ważewski topological method in studying asymptotic behaviour of solutions;
  - exact estimates of exponential growth of solution of second-order linear differential equations with bounded coefficients;
  - theorems concerning global asymptotic stability of the autonomous system on the plane with stable Jacobian matrix at each point of the plane, results establishing relation between question of global asymptotic stability of an autonomous system and that of global one-to-oneness of a differentiable map;
  - contribution to the question whether unicity condition implies convergence of successive approximation to solutions of ordinary differential equations.
- Contribution to optimal control theory:
  - establishing a most general version of the so-called bang-bang principle for linear control problem by detailed study of the integral of set valued map;
  - existence theorems for optimal control problem with unbounded controls and multidimensional cost functions;
  - existence of solution of differential inclusions with nonconvex right-hand side;
  - characterization of controllability of convex processes.

== Recognition ==
Honorary doctorates:

- Vilnius University 1989
- Jagiellonian University in Kraków 2006
- AGH University of Science and Technology in Kraków 2009.

Membership of:

- PAN Polish Academy of Sciences (member of the Presidium),
- PAU Polish Academy of Arts when he was there he mastered the skill “I need the maxween
- Pontifical Academy of Sciences
- Russian Academy of Sciences
- Polish Mathematical Society
- European Mathematical Society
- American Mathematical Society

Awards and honours:

- State Prize of Poland 1st Class
- The Commander's Cross of the Order of Polonia Restituta
- Marin Drinov Golden Medal, Bulgarian Academy of Sciences
- Bernard Bolzano Golden Medal, Czechoslovak Academy of Sciences
- Stefan Banach Medal, Polish Academy of Sciences
- Mikołaj Kopernik Medal, Polish Academy of Sciences

== Publications ==
- Szafraniec, F.; Olech, Cz.; Janas, J. (1997). "Włodzimierz Mlak (1931-1994)". Annales Polonici Mathematici. 66: 1–9. doi:10.4064/ap-66-1-1-9.
- Meisters, Gary H.; Olech, Czesław (1993). "Power-exact, nilpotent, homogeneous matrices". Linear and Multilinear Algebra. 35 (3–4): 225–236. doi:10.1080/03081089308818260. S2CID 121224054.
- Meisters, Gary H.; Olech, Czeslaw (1991). "Strong nilpotence holds in dimensions up to five only∗". Linear and Multilinear Algebra. 30 (4): 231–255. doi:10.1080/03081089108818109.
- Olech, C.; Parthasarathy, T.; Ravindran, G. (1991). "Almost N-matrices and linear complementarity". Linear Algebra and Its Applications. 145: 107–125. doi:10.1016/0024-3795(91)90290-D.
- Olech, Czesław; Meisters, Gary H. (1990). "A Jacobian condition for injectivity of differentiable plane maps". Annales Polonici Mathematici. 51: 249–254. doi:10.4064/ap-51-1-249-254.
- Olech, Czesław; Lasota, Andrzej (1990). "Zdzisław Opial---a mathematician 1930--1974". Annales Polonici Mathematici. 51: 7–13. doi:10.4064/ap-51-1-7-13.
- Olech, Czesraw (1990). "The Lyapunov Theorem: Its extensions and applications". Methods of Nonconvex Analysis. Lecture Notes in Mathematics. Vol. 1446. pp. 84–103. doi:10.1007/BFb0084932. ISBN 978-3-540-53120-3.
- Olech, Czeslaw (1987). "Onn-dimensional extensions of Fatou's lemma". Zeitschrift für Angewandte Mathematik und Physik. 38 (2): 266–272. Bibcode:1987ZaMP...38..266O. doi:10.1007/BF00945411. S2CID 119939965.
- Aubin, Jean-Pierre; Frankowska, Halina; Olech, Czesław (1986). "Controllability of Convex Processes" (PDF). SIAM Journal on Control and Optimization. 24 (6): 1192–1211. doi:10.1137/0324072.
- Olech, Czesław (1984). "Decomposability as a substitute for convexity". Multifunctions and Integrands. Lecture Notes in Mathematics. Vol. 1091. pp. 193–205. doi:10.1007/BFb0098812. ISBN 978-3-540-13882-2.
- Frankowska, Halina; Olech, Czeslaw (1982). "Boundary solutions of differential inclusion". Journal of Differential Equations. 44 (2): 156–165. Bibcode:1982JDE....44..156F. doi:10.1016/0022-0396(82)90011-0.
- Olech, C. (1976). "Weak lower semicontinuity of integral functionals". Journal of Optimization Theory and Applications. 19: 3–16. doi:10.1007/BF00934048. S2CID 121143492.
- Olech, Czeslaw (1975). "Existence Theory in Optimal Control Problems - the Underlying Ideas". International Conference on Differential Equations. pp. 612–635. doi:10.1016/B978-0-12-059650-8.50050-8. ISBN 9780120596508.
- Olech, Czeslaw (1974). "The Characterization of the Weak Closure of Certain Sets of Integrable Functions". SIAM Journal on Control. 12 (2): 311–318. doi:10.1137/0312024.
- Olech, Czełsaw (1969). "Existence theorems for optimal control problems involving multiple integrals". Journal of Differential Equations. 6 (3): 512–526. Bibcode:1969JDE.....6..512O. doi:10.1016/0022-0396(69)90007-2.
- Olech, Czesław (1969). "Existence theorems for optimal problems with vector-valued cost function". Transactions of the American Mathematical Society. 136: 159. doi:10.1090/S0002-9947-1969-0234338-5. hdl:2060/19680002338.
- Olech, Czesław (1968). "On the range of an unbounded vector-valued measure". Mathematical Systems Theory. 2 (3): 251–256. doi:10.1007/BF01694009. hdl:2060/19680006853. S2CID 29086435.
- Olech, Czesław (1968). "Approximation of set-valued functions by continuous functions". Colloquium Mathematicum. 19 (2): 285–293. doi:10.4064/cm-19-2-285-293.
- Szegö, G. P.; Olech, C.; Cellina, A. (1968). "On the stability properties of a third order system". Annali di Matematica Pura ed Applicata. 78: 91–103. doi:10.1007/BF02415111. S2CID 119973869.
- Klee, Victor; Olech, Czeslaw (1967). "Characterizations of a Class of Convex Sets". Mathematica Scandinavica. 20: 290. doi:10.7146/math.scand.a-10839.
- Pliś, A.; Olech, C. (1967). "Monotonicity assumption in uniqueness criteria for differential equations". Colloquium Mathematicum. 18: 43–58. doi:10.4064/cm-18-1-43-58.
- Olech, C. (1967). "On a system of integral inequalities". Colloquium Mathematicum. 16: 137–139. doi:10.4064/cm-16-1-137-139.
- Olech, C.; Lasota, A. (1966). "An optimal solution of Nicoletti's boundary value problem". Annales Polonici Mathematici. 18 (2): 131–139. doi:10.4064/ap-18-2-131-139.
- Olech, Czesław (1966). "Extremal solutions of a control system". Journal of Differential Equations. 2 (1): 74–101. Bibcode:1966JDE.....2...74O. doi:10.1016/0022-0396(66)90064-7.
- Olech, Czeslaw (1964). "Global phase- portrait of a plane autonomous system". Annales de l'Institut Fourier. 14: 87–97. doi:10.5802/aif.164.
- Olech, C.; Mlak, W. (1963). "Integration of infinite systems of differential inequalities". Annales Polonici Mathematici. 13: 105–112. doi:10.4064/ap-13-1-105-112.
- Meisters, G. H.; Olech, C. (1963). "Schlicht functions". Duke Mathematical Journal. 30: 63–80. doi:10.1215/S0012-7094-63-03008-4.
- Hartman, Philip; Olech, Czeslaw (1962). "On Global Asymptotic Stability of Solutions of Differential Equations". Transactions of the American Mathematical Society. 104 (1): 154–178. doi:10.2307/1993939. JSTOR 1993939.
- Olech, C. (1962). "A connection between two certain methods of successive approximations in differential equations". Annales Polonici Mathematici. 11 (3): 237–245. doi:10.4064/ap-11-3-237-245.
- Olech, C. (1961). "On the asymptotic coincidence of sets filled up by integrals of two systems of ordinary differential equations". Annales Polonici Mathematici. 11: 49–74. doi:10.4064/ap-11-1-49-74.
- Olech, C. (1960). "A simple proof of a certain result of Z. Opial". Annales Polonici Mathematici. 8: 61–63. doi:10.4064/ap-8-1-61-63.
- Opial, Z.; Olech, C. (1960). "Sur une inégalité différentielle". Annales Polonici Mathematici. 7 (3): 247–254. doi:10.4064/ap-7-3-247-254.
- Olech, Czeslaw (1957). "Sur un problème de M. G. Sansone lié à la théorie du synchrotrone". Annali di Matematica Pura ed Applicata. 44: 317–329. doi:10.1007/BF02415206. S2CID 170536734.
- Olech, C. (1957). "Sur certaines propriétés des intégrales de l'équation y'=f(x,y) dont le second membre est doublement périodique". Annales Polonici Mathematici. 3 (2): 189–199. doi:10.4064/ap-3-2-189-199.
- Olech, C.; Gołąb, Stanisław (1955). "Contribution à la théorie de la formule simpsonienne des quadratures approchées". Annales Polonici Mathematici. 1: 176–183. doi:10.4064/ap-1-1-176-183.
