= Witold Wilkosz =

Polish physicist

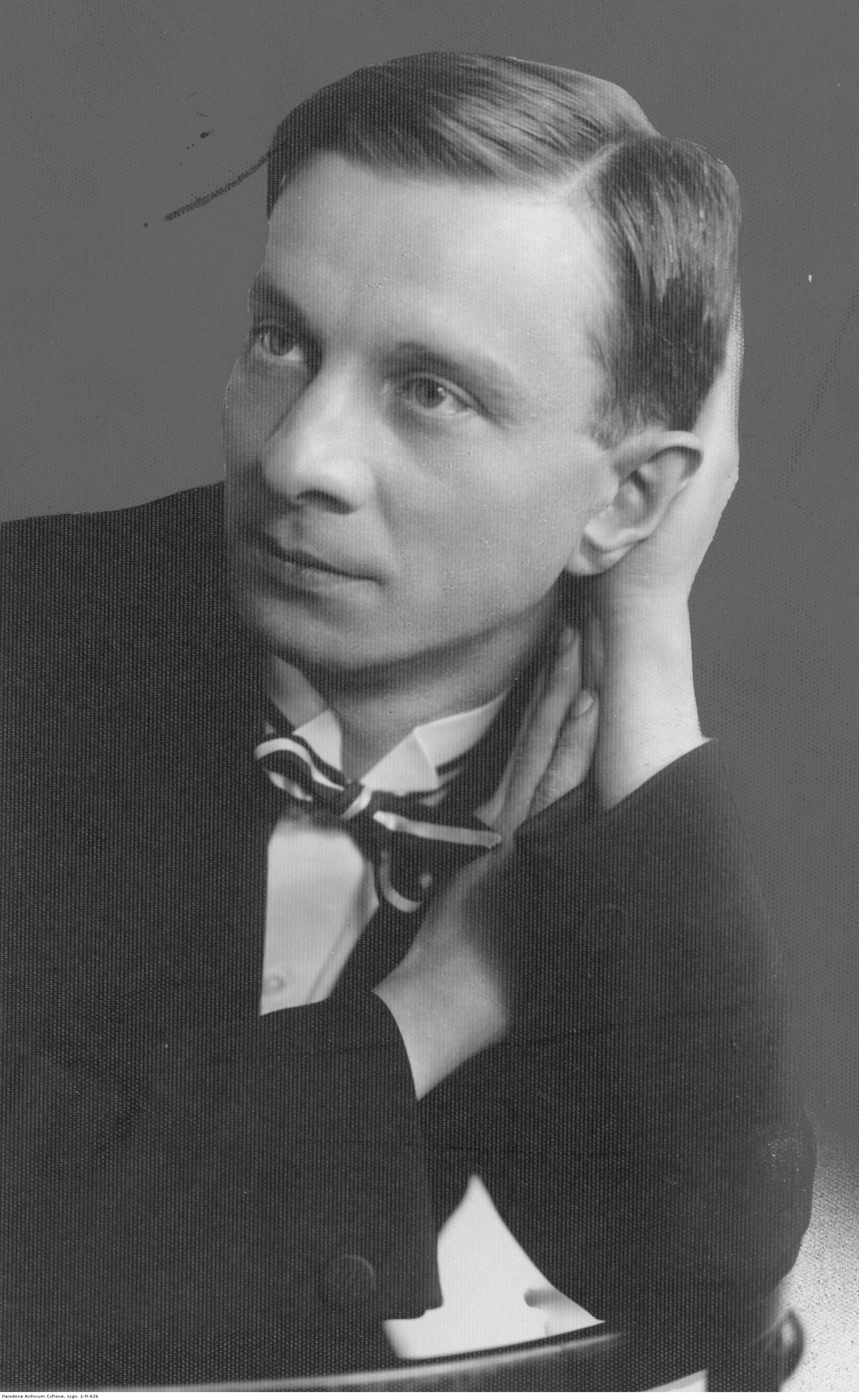
- Wilkosz in 1929
- Born: 14 August 1891; Kraków, Grand Duchy of Kraków, Austria-Hungary (today Poland)
- Died: 31 March 1941 (aged 49); Kraków, Poland
- Education: Jagiellonian University
- Scientific career
- Fields: Mathematics, Physics, Philosophy

Witold Wilkosz (14 August 1891 – 31 March 1941) was a Polish mathematician, physicist, philosopher and popularizer of science.

== Life and career ==
Witold Wilkosz was born on 14 August 1891 in Kraków to parents Jan, a Polish teacher, and Józefa née Vopalko. He showed a considerable talent for mathematics and languages since early childhood. He passed his final school-leaving Matura exam at the John III Sobieski High School (known in Poland as Gimnasium). He was a friend of fellow mathematician Stefan Banach. Before graduating from high school, he had written an article on semitology for which he was offered a scholarship and membership from Morgenländische Gesselchaft Scienctific Society, which enabled him to study at the University of Beirut. After a few months, he returned to Kraków and took up studies in philology at the Jagiellonian University. After two years, he decided to change the course to mathematics, which he studied in Kraków and Turin. He received his doctoral degree on the basis of his dissertation on Lebesgue integrals and started to work as an academic teacher at his alma mater. In 1920, he obtained a habilitation and in 1936 he became a professor. He was arrested on 6 November 1939 by Nazi Germans alongside other prominent intellectuals and professors of Kraków in the infamous Sonderaktion Krakau. However, due to a serious illness, he was soon released together with nine other professors on 9 November. He returned home and began to work as a teacher. To supplement his income, he accepted another job at the Powszechny Zakład Ubezpieczeń Wzajemnych insurance company. In the following years, his health seriously deteriorated. He died of pneumonia on 31 March 1941.

== Published work ==
- Z teorii funkcji absolutnie ciągłych i całek Lebesgue’a (doctoral dissertation), 1918
- O funkcjach ściśle mierzalnych i Duhamelowskich wraz z zastosowaniami do teorii równań całkowych i różniczkowych, 1920
- Les proprietés topologiques du plan euclidien, Paris, 1931
- Liczę i myślę, Kraków, 1938
- Jak powstała liczba, 1938
- Człowiek stwarza naukę, Kraków, 1946

== See also ==
- List of Polish mathematicians
- List of Poles
