= Andrzej Kapiszewski =

Polish sociologist and diplomat

Andrzej Tadeusz Kapiszewski (1948–2007) was a Polish sociologist and diplomat. Member of the Polish Academy of Sciences, professor at the Jagiellonian University, one of the creators of the Faculty of International and Political Relations and Chair of Middle and Far East Studies. Founder and first rector of the private academy in Kraków (the Krakowska Szkoła Wyższa im. A. Frycza Modrzewskiego).

Polish chargé d'affaires and ambassador to United Arab Emirates and Qatar.

== Works ==
- Conflicts across the Atlantic. Ksiẹgarnia Akademicka, Kraków, 2004 ISBN 83-7188-682-9
