= Anna Zofia Krygowska =

Polish mathematician

- Born: 1904; Lwów
- Died: 16 May 1988 (aged 83–84)

Academic background
- Education: Jagiellonian University
- Doctoral advisor: Tadeusz Ważewski

Academic work
- Discipline: Mathematician
- Sub-discipline: Mathematics education
- Institutions: Pedagogical University of Kraków

Anna Zofia Krygowska (1904–1988) was a Polish mathematician, known for her work in mathematics education.

Krygowska was born in Lwów, at that time the capital of Austrian Poland, on 19 September 1904. She grew up in Zakopane, and attended the Jagiellonian University in Kraków, where she graduated in mathematics in 1927. From 1927 to 1950 she was a primary and secondary school mathematics teacher in Poland, including a time spent underground during World War II. In 1950 she earned a doctorate from the Jagiellonian University, under the supervision of Tadeusz Ważewski, and joined the faculty of the Pedagogical University of Kraków. In 1958 she was promoted to head of the newly formed Department of Didactics of Mathematics. She retired in 1974.

Krygowska was an active participant in national and international groups concerning the teaching of mathematics. In 1956 she was part of the Polish delegation to the UNESCO conference of ministers of public education, and organized two conferences of the International Commission for the Study and Improvement of Mathematics Teaching (CIEAEM), in 1960 and 1971; she became president of CIEAEM in 1970, and honorary president in 1974. She also spoke on mathematics education at the International Congress of Mathematicians in 1966 and 1970.

She died on 16 May 1988.
