= Zbigniew Marciniak =

Polish mathematician and university teacher

Zbigniew Stanisław Marciniak
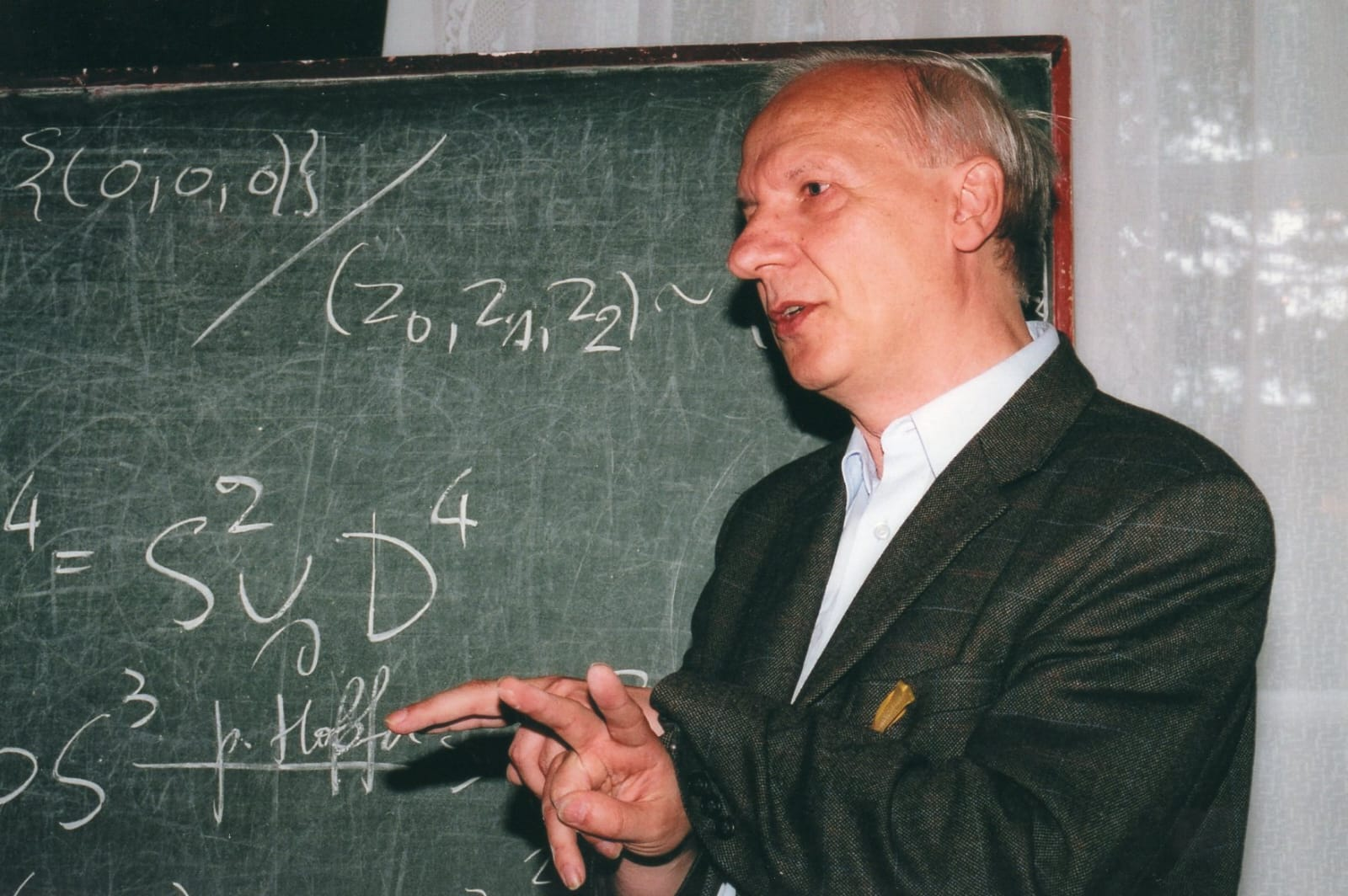
- Marciniak in 2026
- Born: April 9, 1952 (age 74); Warszawa, Polska
- Education: Warsaw University
- Occupations: mathematician, professor
- Known for: Group theory

Zbigniew Stanisław Marciniak (born 9 April 1952 in Warsaw) is a Polish mathematician and university teacher. Between 2007–2009 he was an Education vice-secretary and from 2010 until 2012 he was Science Secretary.

== Life ==
He graduated mathematic studies in 1976 on the Department of Mathematic, IT and Mechanics of Warsaw University. In 1982 he was taking a PhD degree in Virginia Polytechnic Institute and State University and postdoctoral degree in 1997. Dr. Marciniak specializes in Group theory and Ring theory.

From the time of graduation he has been working for Mathematical Institute of Warsaw University, from 1997 in the position of Professor. Since 1996 until 1999 he took the function of deputy head, then until 2005 the function of headmaster of this university. In 2005–2007 he led The Polish Accreditation Committee, next he became a leader of Committee on Teaching of Mathematics PAN. He takes the participation in the editorial committees of journals "Delta" and "Algebra and Discrete Mathematics", represented Poland in the PISA coordinated by the OECD.

On 28 November 2007 he took the position of Secretary of State in Ministerstwo Edukacji Narodowej. On 26 August 2009 he was dismissed from the office. On 31 December 2009 he took the position of Secretary of State in Ministerstwo Nauki i Szkolnictwa Wyższego. On 31 January 2012 he was also dismissed.

Awarded with Silver Cross of Merit and Order of Polonia Restituta.

== Bibliography ==
- . [dostęp 2012-01-31].
