= Władysław Ślebodziński =

Polish mathematician (1884–1972)

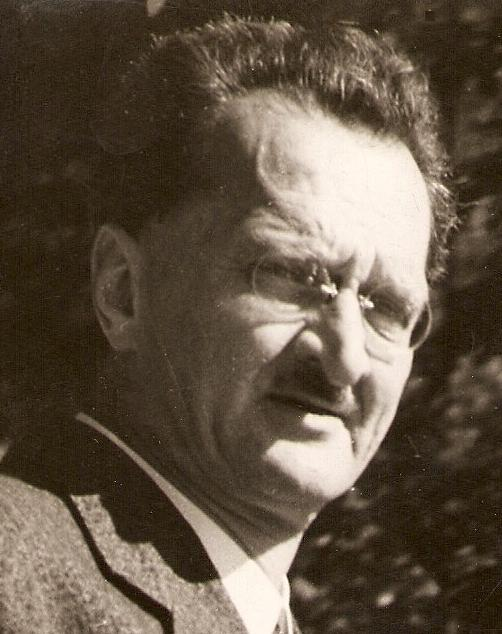
- Ślebodziński in 1938
- Born: 6 February 1884; Pysznica, Kingdom of Galicia and Lodomeria, Austria-Hungary
- Died: 3 January 1972 (aged 87); Wrocław, Poland
- Education: Jagiellonian University
- Known for: Differential Geometry; Lie derivative
- Scientific career
- Fields: Mathematics
- Workplaces: University of Wrocław; Wrocław University of Technology; University of Poznań
- Thesis: O pewnej klasie powierzchni Riemanna (1928)
- Doctoral advisor: Kazimierz Żorawski
- Doctoral students: Witold Roter

Władysław Zygmunt Ślebodziński (Polish pronunciation: [vwaˈdɨswaf ɕlɛbɔˈd͡ʑij̃skʲi]; 6 February 1884 – 3 January 1972) was a Polish mathematician, a former Auschwitz concentration camp prisoner, a professor at the Wrocław University of Technology and a member of the Polish Academy of Sciences.

In 1961–1963, he served as president of the Polish Mathematical Society. He was a co-founder and a leading representative of the Wroclaw School of Mathematics. He is noted for introducing an operator in differential geometry later named the Lie derivative.

== Life and career ==
=== Early life and education ===
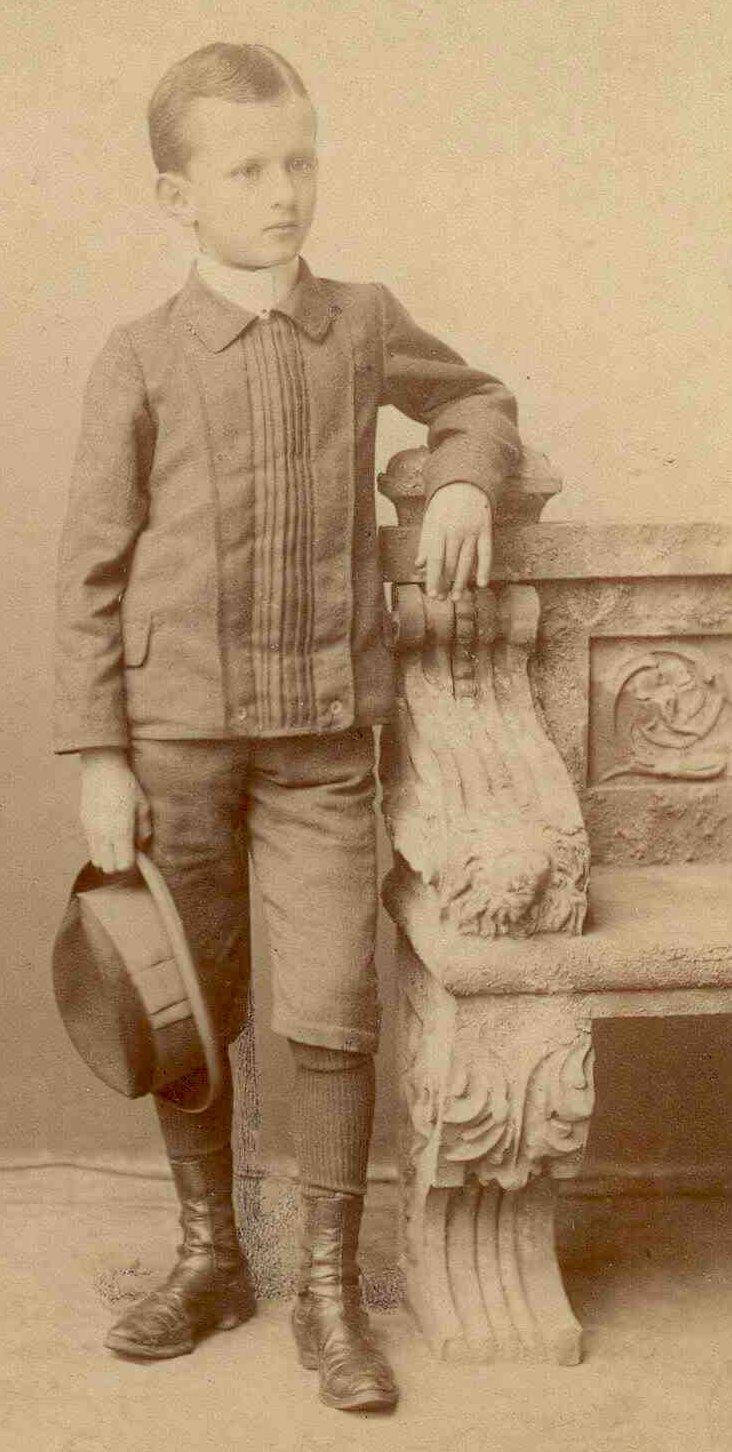
Ślebodziński in 1895

Władysław Ślebodziński was born on 6 February 1884 in Pysznica, then part of the Kingdom of Galicia and Lodomeria, as the son of Ignacy and Anna (née Gorylska). In 1903–1908, he studied mathematics and physics at the Jagiellonian University in Kraków.

In 1908, he became a teacher of mathematics and worked at gymnasiums in Sanok and Tarnobrzeg. In 1912, Ślebodziński transferred to Kraków where he held a teaching position at the Imperial-Royal Real School. In 1913–1914, he pursued further studies at the University of Göttingen attending lectures by Constantin Carathéodory, Edmund Landau and David Hilbert.

=== Career beginnings ===
During World War I, Ślebodziński served only six months in the Austrian Army before being transferred back to Kraków at the Imperial-Royal Real School due to his essential role in education. In this period, Ślebodziński became acquainted with such prominent mathematicians as Hugo Steinhaus, Stefan Banach, and Włodzimierz Stożek.

In the 1920s, Ślebodziński lectured in mathematics at the Faculty of Pharmacy of the University of Poznań. He simultaneously taught mathematics at the State School of Machine Construction (Polish: Państwowa Szkoła Budowy Maszyn). He was also active in the Association of Teachers of Secondary and Higher Schools (TNSW) serving as chairman of the Poznań branch of the organization in 1924.

In 1927, Ślebodziński participated in the First Polish Mathematical Congress in Lwów, having been appointed chairman of the Geometry Section. In 1928, Ślebodziński earned his doctorate at the University of Warsaw based on his thesis O pewnej klasie powierzchni Riemanna (On a Certain Class of Riemann Surfaces) written under the supervision of Kazimierz Żorawski. In 1934, he obtained his habilitation and started work as a docent at the University of Warsaw.

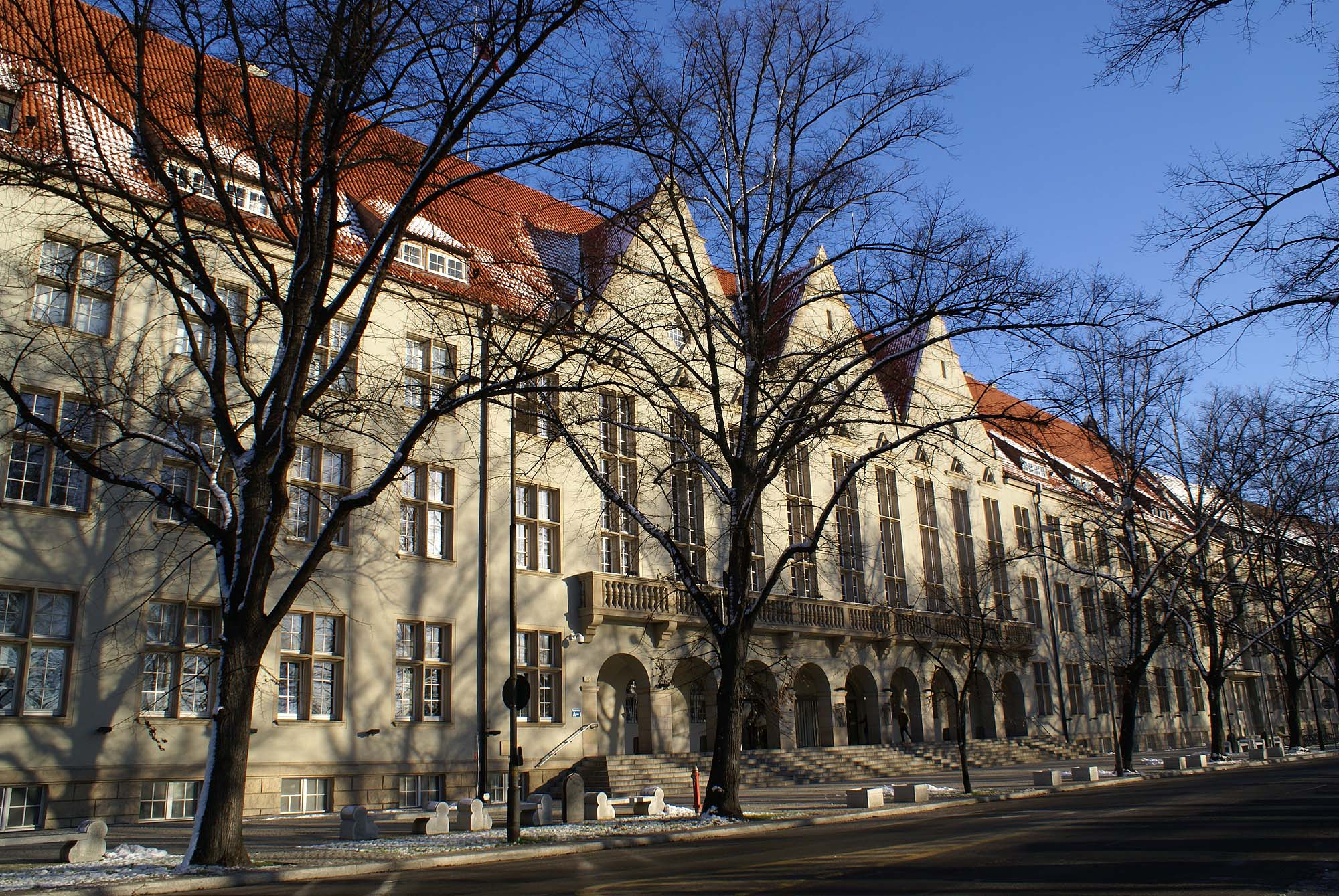
Ślebodziński was affiliated with the Wrocław University of Technology for much of his career

=== World War II ===
During the World War II, he was forced to relocate from Poznań to Bochnia in southern Poland. He gave underground lectures, leading to his imprisonment by Nazi Germany. He survived three German concentration camps: Auschwitz (1942–1945), where he gave underground university-level lectures as prisoner no. 79053 and survived the "Death March" to Wodzisław Śląski after the camp had been evacuated before the advancement of the Soviet troops in 1945; Gross-Rosen; and Nordhausen.

=== Postwar career ===
In 1945, he became a joint professor at Wrocław University and at the Wrocław University of Technology, and from 1951 he was a professor at the Wrocław University of Technology. From 1949 until 1960, he was a Professor of the Institute of Mathematics of the Polish Academy of Sciences.

In 1950, he was one of the co-founders of the journal Colloquim Mathematicum alongside Edward Marczewski, Bronisław Knaster and Hugo Steinhaus. He is also considered one of the founders of the Wrocław School of Mathematics. The relations between the four mathematicians are described by Roman Duda and Aleksander Weron as follows:

They were united by a pioneering zeal and a firm conviction that Wrocław was, and would remain, Polish, as well as by their determination to settle there permanently. As mathematicians, they possessed a substantial body of work recognized internationally, which gave them considerable and natural academic authority; they knew their own worth and held one another in high esteem. All four settled in [the district of] Biskupin (...), which had survived the devastation of the siege, a circumstance that fostered close and friendly relations among them.

Between 1961–1963, he served as president of the Polish Mathematical Society. His notable students included Witold Roter, Ryszard Deszcz, Stefan Drobot, Abraham Goetz, and Tadeusz Huskowski.

He died on 3 January 1972, in Wrocław, and is buried in the Wrocław Cemetery located in Sępolno.

=== Personal life ===
In 1908, he married Anna Gisella née Zarnecka (1879-1970) in St. Nicholas Church in Kraków. They had two children: son Lesław, a chemistry teacher, and daughter Zofia Krystyna, a mathematics teacher and a graduate of the University of Poznań.

== Awards, decorations, and honors ==
- 1958: Commander's Cross of the Order of Polonia Restituta
- 1955: Polish State Award (team award of 2nd degree) for his contributions in differential geometry
- 1954: Polish Golden Cross of Merit, for his scientific achievements
- 1918: 1908 Jubilee Cross (Austria-Hungary),

He accepted honorary doctorates from the Wrocław University of Technology (1965), Poznań University of Technology (1967), and the University of Wrocław (1970). He also became an honorary member of the Polish Mathematical Society.

== Contributions ==
In his early career Ślebodziński was interested in Galois theory; however, he later focused primarily on differential geometry and made his most important contributions in that area. In 1931, he introduced a new differential operator known as the Lie derivative, in his work titled Sur les équations canoniques de Hamilton. According to J.A. Schouten, it was David van Dantzig who named the operation "Lie derivative" (after Sophus Lie) for the first time in a two-part paper published in 1932 acknowledging it was Ślebodziński who had introduced it.

The Lie derivative evaluates the change of a tensor field eg. scalar functions, vector fields and one-forms, along the flow defined by another vector field. It played a significant role in the rapid advancement of several branches of differential geometry serving as a crucial and highly effective tool in the study of automorphism groups and finding broad, meaningful applications throughout geometry.

== See also ==
- Kraków School of Mathematics
