= Tadeusz Ważewski =

Polish mathematician (1896–1972)

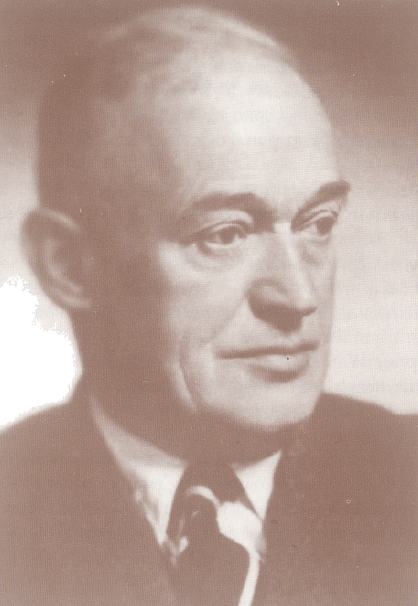
- Born: 24 September 1896; Chortkiv, Galicia, Austria-Hungary
- Died: 5 September 1972 (aged 75); Rabka-Zdrój
- Education: University of Paris
- Scientific career
- Fields: Mathematics
- Workplaces: Jagiellonian University
- Doctoral advisor: Stanisław Zaremba
- Doctoral students: Anna Zofia Krygowska; Stanisław Łojasiewicz; Czesław Olech; Andrzej Pliś; Zofia Szmydt

Tadeusz Ważewski (24 September 1896 – 5 September 1972) was a Polish mathematician.

Ważewski made important contributions to the theory of ordinary differential equations, partial differential equations, control theory and the theory of analytic spaces. He is most famous for applying the topological concept of retract, introduced by Karol Borsuk, to the study of the solutions of differential equations.

== Biography ==
Ważewski was born in Galicia on the 24 September 1896 to parents Stanisław Ważewski and Anieli Kozlowskich. He would attend schools in Mielec and Przemyśl before attending the Tarnow secondary school in 1914. Ważewski went to, originally, study physics at the Jagiellonian University (Krakow), but after being convinced by Stanisław Zaremba, he would change his degree to mathematics.

Zaremba helped Tadeusz get a scholarship to study at the University of Paris from 1921 to 1923 where he would continue the study of topology and set theory which Zaremba had influenced him to study. In 1924 he attained his Doctorate based on his thesis On Jordan curves containing no simple closed Jordan curve (French). Then in 1927 he was awarded the Habilitation at the Jagiellonian University on the basis of the thesis Rectifiable Continuums in Relation to Absolutely Continuous Functions and Mappings (Polish).

Two of his advisors were Émile Borel and Arnaud Denjoy at the University of Paris.

In the years after his Habilitation he continued to work at the Jagiellonian University but his focus had moved from topology to analysis. Ważewski was made a professor at the university in 1933.

During World War II Ważewski was taken to the Sachsenhausen-Oranienburg concentration camp where he would be kept until his release in February 1940. Once released he continued to teach in secret.

Ważewski worked as a full-time professor after the war at the Jagiellonian University in 1945. He was the head of the Department of Differential Equations for all of his life in the State Mathematical Institute. Ważewski was given a Doctor of Sciences (Mathematics) in 1953. After this he was awarded an honorary doctorate in 1967 from the university.

In 1923 he was inducted into the Polish Mathematical Society. Ważewski was made the president of the society for two years beginning on 1959 before becoming an honorary member in 1967. He also worked at the State Institute of Mathematics, which was incorporated into the Polish Academy of Sciences in 1952.

Tadeusz died in Rabka-Zdrój on 5 September 1972.
