= Grodzisko Górne =

- Village
- Location within Poland
- Coordinates: 50°11′20″N 22°26′14″E
- Country: Poland
- Voivodeship: Subcarpathian
- County: Leżajsk
- Gmina: Grodzisko Dolne

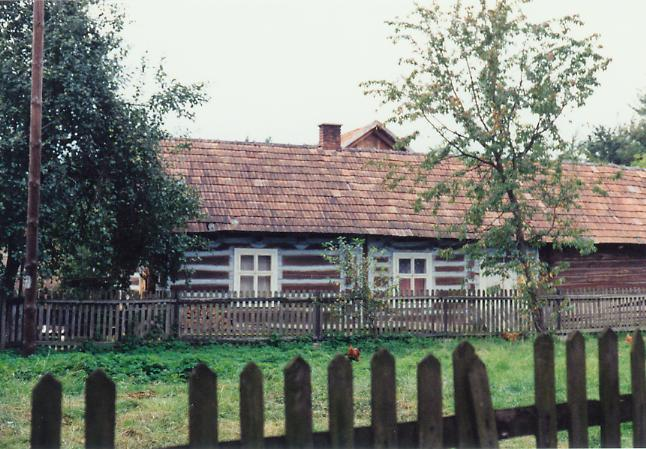
An old cottage in Grodzisko Gorne

Grodzisko Górne [ɡrɔˈd͡ʑiskɔ ˈɡurnɛ] is a farming village in the administrative district of Gmina Grodzisko Dolne, within Leżajsk County, Subcarpathian Voivodeship, in south-eastern Poland.

The village is situated on the Wisłok river, which flows into the San river in Dębno, located near Leżajsk, on the edge of a Ruthenian settlement. The village separated itself as an independent administrative and economic unit from Grodzisko Dolne in 1786, along with another village called Grodzisko Nowe. In some cases, especially in immigration records, the two are referred to as one town called Grodzisko. The name Grodzisko comes from the word Gord, denoting a Slavic settlement. Grodzisko Górne itself was formerly a defensive settlement, as it is on the border with Ukraine. In 1881, an archaeological group from Kraków received a warrant to research the history of Grodzisko Górne. They found imprints of ancient settlements, probably dating back to immigrants from the 4th to 5th centuries. These archaeological works are still in progress today. It is bordered by a canyon, whose north bank provided much of the defense for this village. In the village there is an ancient manor house, which was opened for tourism in the 19th century. It is maintained by a priest from Grodzisko Górne, Wojciech Micha. The village employs many of the wage earners who reside in the rural commune of Grodzisko Dolne. The main industry is cloth manufacturing. Locally famous cloth markets are organized there. For farming, the major estate has 332 morgs of farmland and 58 meadows and gardens. The minor estate has 3200 morgs of farmland, 341 morgs of meadows and gardens, 216 morgs of pasture land and 428 morgs of forest. Today there is a three-grade schoolhouse and a post office in the village, serving its population of 5094, including 364 Jews.

== Territorial membership ==
- 1340–1772: administrative unit of L'viv, in the Ruthenian Voivodeship. In 1754, the Roman Catholic parish was constructed.
- 1772–1918: in the Kingdom of Galicia and Lodomeria, under the Austrian Empire. The registered population of Grodzisko Dolne and Grodzisko Górne combined was 2181 (in 1857). The owner of the village during this time was Anthony Kellermann.
- 1918–1939: in the powiat of Łańcut, within the L'viv Voivodeship. The population was 2273 in 1930.
- 1945–1998: located in the Rzeszów Voivodeship

== Landlords of Grodzisko Górne ==
- In the 14th century, the village was part of the Przeworsk-Jarosław estate, which belonged to the Leliwita, Tarnowski, and Jaroslawski families.
- When Lord Hieronim of Jarosław and Przeworsk died without children, ownership of the village was passed to Jan Leliwita, a count who resided in Tarnów. Jan Leliwita was married to Zofia Odrawaz.
- In the late 16th century, ownership was later passed to Aleksander Konstanty Ostrogski. When he died, it was passed to his daughter, Zofia, who married Stanisław Lubomirski, voivode of Kraków and the owner of Łańcut.
- When his estate was divided, Grodzisko belonged to the branch of the Lubomirski family who owned Przeworsk.
- The last Lord of Grodzisko was Marcin Lubomirski, who sold the village in 1779 to Maciej Aleksander Borzecki.
- In 1787, it belonged to Michal Drohojewski and later the Kellermann family. Anthony Kellermann still owned it in 1868.
- On the turn of the century, Grodzisko belonged to the baroness Domicela Branhidy. Only the farm and the manor in Grodzisko Dolne survived through World War II. They were owned by Zygmunt and Irena Litynski.

== History ==
- According to local tradition, Grodzisko was first established by King Bolesław I of Poland in the 11th century. This is mentioned in historical documents in Przeworsk dating back to the 14th century.
- Polish charter books from 1929 to 1930 state:

- Schools and pay offices in Grodzisko Górne borrow money to help the local economy.
- Village midwife: M. Rydzik
- Village trade:
Dairy Products: S. Ringel, G. Wolkenheim
Food: G. Wolkenfeld
Swine: F. Majkut, S. Majkut, Sz. and J. Rynasiewicz
Tobacco: W. Kulpa
Alcohol: K. Bekarska

== Attractions ==
- There are habitable, wooden residences with embellished porches dating back to the 19th and 20th centuries.
- A shrine, located on the border with the village of Biedaczowa, was endowed in 1895. It is made of brick and enclosed within a quadrangle. It is dedicated to St. Catherine, St. Anthony, St. Clare, and St. John the Baptist. Past shrines can be found in the bell tower.
- In 1974, Stanislaw Krzeszowski began a musical group called Grodziszczoki which now plays ritually at weddings in Grodzisko Górne.
- There is a military procession called Parada Straży Grobowych, also known as Turki, which takes place in the village. It was started by King Jan III Sobieski in 1683. It honors soldiers who have returned from war. The fact that they are dressed in full uniform during this procession is frightening to some of the local population. It also serves as a procession to give thanks to God, so it usually takes place around Easter.

== Notable people ==
- Franciszek Leja (1885–1979), mathematician
- Józef Alojzy Hospod (1861–1935), member and activist within the Polish Peasant Party.
