= Annales Polonici Mathematici =

- Discipline: Mathematics
- Language: English

Publication details
- Former name(s): Annales de la Société Polonaise de Mathématique
- History: 1921–present
- Publisher: Polish Academy of Sciences (Poland)

Standard abbreviations
- ISO 4: Ann. Pol. Math.
- MathSciNet: Ann. Polon. Math.

Indexing
- ISSN: 0066-2216 (print); 1730-6272 (web)
- OCLC no.: 1481338

Links
- Journal homepage

Annales Polonici Mathematici is a mathematical journal published by the Mathematical Institute of the Polish Academy of Sciences. Usually 2 volumes of 3 issues are published. All articles published by this journal are indexed and described in Mathematical Reviews. The journal publishes original research papers in mathematical analysis and geometry. As of October 2023, the editor-in-chief of the journal is Sławomir Kołodziej.

== History ==
In pursuit of its statutory goals, the Polish Mathematical Society (PTM) began publishing its own journal in 1921, which, beginning with volume two, was called Annales de la Société Polonaise de Mathématique, with Stanisław Zaremba as editor. By the outbreak of World War II, 17 volumes of this journal had been published. It was published in congressional languages, but the "Supplements" printed for some volumes were in Polish. They included, among other things, documents from the life of the Society, such as statutes, reports and minutes.

The journal was reissued after the war and by 1952 PTM had published another 8 volumes. In 1953, all mathematical publications of the PTM, including Annales, were taken over by the Mathematical Institute of the Polish Academy of Sciences. A new journal, Annales Polonici Mathematici, was created on the basis of Annales, and its first issue was published in 1954.
