= Polish School of Mathematics =

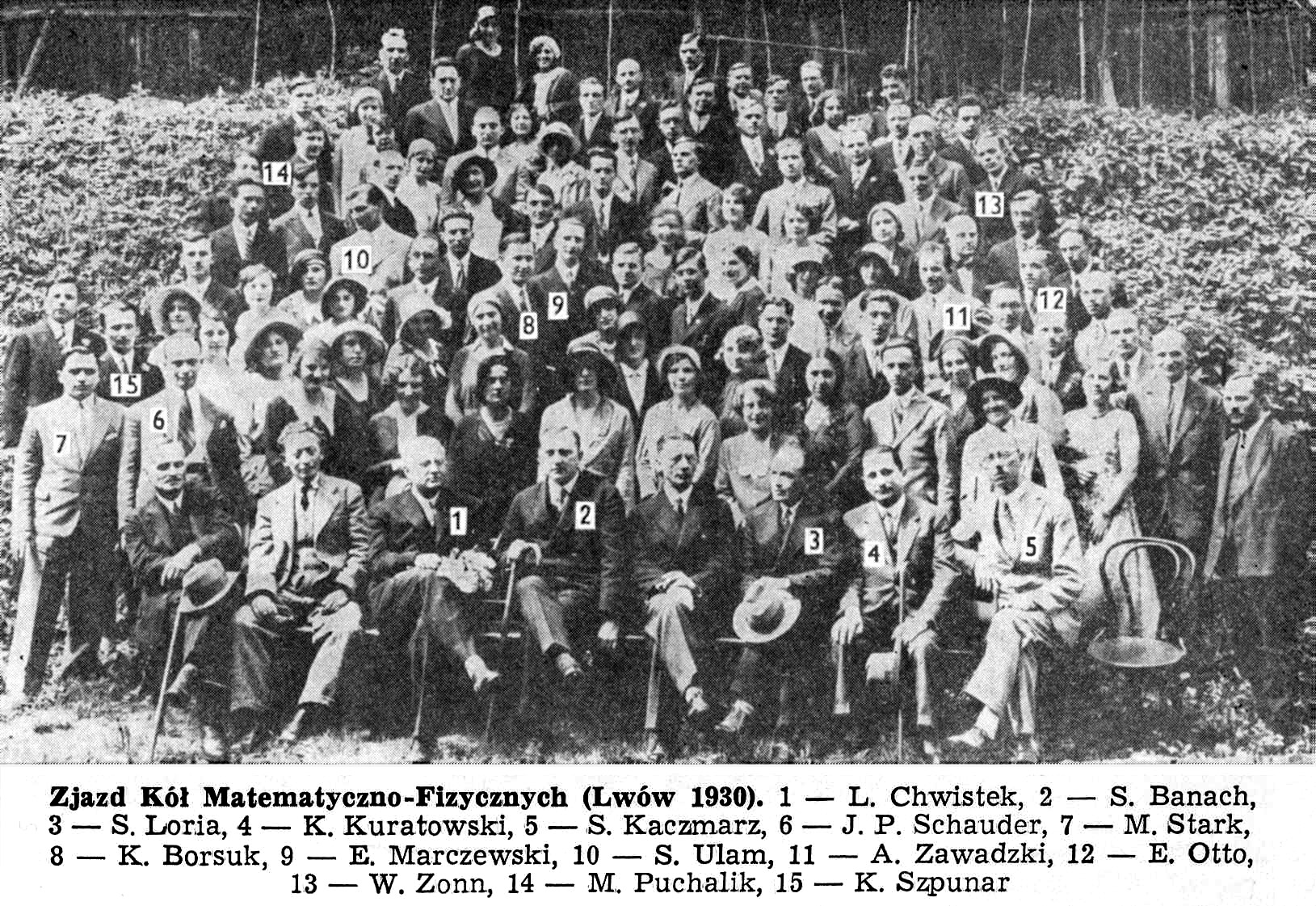
Lviv mathematicians, 1930.

The Polish School of Mathematics was the mathematics community that flourished in Poland in the 20th century, particularly during the Interbellum between World Wars I and II.

== Overview ==
The Polish School of Mathematics subsumed:

- the Lwów School of Mathematics - mostly focused on functional analysis;
- the Warsaw School of Mathematics - mostly focused on set theory, mathematical logic and topology; and
- the Kraków School of Mathematics - mostly focused on differential equations, analytic functions, differential geometry.

=== Nomenclature ===
Poland's mathematicians provided a name to Polish notation and Polish space.

=== Background ===
It has been debated what stimulated the exceptional efflorescence of mathematics in Poland after World War I. Important preparatory work had been done by the Polish "Positivists" following the disastrous January 1863 Uprising. The Positivists extolled science and technology, and popularized slogans of "organic work" and "building from the foundations." In the 20th century, mathematics was a field of endeavor that could be successfully pursued even with the limited resources that Poland commanded in the interbellum period.

=== Historical Influences ===
Over the centuries, Polish mathematicians have influenced the course of history. Copernicus used mathematics to buttress his revolutionary heliocentric theory. Four hundred years later, Marian Rejewski — subsequently assisted by fellow mathematician-cryptologists Jerzy Różycki and Henryk Zygalski — in December 1932 first broke the German Enigma machine cipher, thus laying the foundations for British World War II reading of Enigma ciphers ("Ultra"). After the war, Stanisław Ulam showed Edward Teller how to construct a practicable hydrogen bomb.

== See also ==
- Lwów-Warsaw School of Logic
