= Adam Kanigowski =

Polish mathematician (born 1989)

- Born: April 15, 1989 (age 37); Toruń, Poland
- Awards: International Stefan Banach Prize (2016); Kuratowski Prize (2017); Institute of Mathematics of the Polish Academy of Sciences Prize (2024); EMS Prize (2024)

Academic background
- Education: Nicolaus Copernicus University in Toruń; Institute of Mathematics of the Polish Academy of Sciences
- Thesis: Ergodic properties of smooth flows on surfaces (2015)
- Doctoral advisor: Mariusz Lemańczyk; Joanna Kułaga-Przymus

Academic work
- Discipline: Mathematics
- Institutions: University of Maryland Jagiellonian University
- Main interests: Dynamical systems Ergodic theory
- Website: https://akanigow.math.umd.edu/

Adam Kanigowski (Polish: [kaɲi ˈɡɔfski]; born 15 April 1989) is a Polish mathematician specializing in dynamical systems and ergodic theory. He is a professor at the University of Maryland.

== Education ==
Kanigowski was born in Toruń. He earned his master's degree in mathematics from the Nicolaus Copernicus University in Toruń in 2012, and his Ph.D. in 2015 from the Institute of Mathematics of the Polish Academy of Sciences, under the supervision of Mariusz Lemańczyk and Joanna Kułaga-Przymus. His dissertation was entitled Własności ergodyczne gładkich potoków na powierzchniach (Ergodic properties of smooth flows on surfaces) and awarded the International Stefan Banach Prize in 2016.

== Career and research ==
After graduating, Kanigowski joined Penn State University as an S. Chowla Research Assistant Professor in 2015 and then joined UMD as an assistant professor in 2018, where he was promoted to full professor in 2024. Since December 2022, Kanigowski has led a flagship project at Jagiellonian University that partly supports a research collaboration with UMD.

Kanigowski's research interests include dynamical systems and ergodic theory as well as their interaction with number theory, geometry and probability theory. In particular, he is interested in randomness and chaos in smooth dynamical systems, classification problems in abstract ergodic theory, and non-standard ergodic theorems that find application in number theory. Together with collaborators, he solved several longstanding open problems and conjuctures, such as the Rokhlin problem, the Sarnak hypothesis, the Katok hypothesis and the Ratner problem.

Kanigowski has published more than 30 papers in premier mathematical journals including the most prestigious ones, such as Annals of Mathematics, Journal of the American Mathematical Society, and Inventiones Mathematicae. Among his collaborators are Dmitry Dolgopyat, Bassam Fayad, Giovanni Forni, Mariusz Lemańczyk, Maksym Radziwiłł, Federico Rodriguez Hertz, and Corinna Ulcigrai.

== Recognition ==
In 2015, the Polish Mathematical Society gave Kanigowski their Prize for Young Mathematicians (he was awarded for a series of six papers in the field of ergodic theory and operator theory). He was the 2016 winner of the International Stefan Banach Prize for a doctoral dissertation in the mathematical sciences. In 2017 he received the Kazimierz Kuratowski Award from the Institute of Mathematics of the Polish Academy of Sciences and the Polish Mathematical Society. In March 2024, the Simons Foundation named Kanigowski a 2024 Simons Fellow in Mathematics, in April he received the Institute of Mathematics of the Polish Academy of Sciences Prize for outstanding scientific achievements in mathematics for his "fundamental results in the field of dynamical systems and ergodic theory", and in July he was awarded the EMS Prize for "his outstanding contributions to the spectral classification and the mixing properties of slowly chaotic dynamical systems".

In 2026, Kanigowski delivered an invited section lecture at the International Congress of Mathematicians in Philadelphia.

== Personal life ==
Adam Kanigowski has two daughters. In June 2024 he finished his first Ironman triathlon.
