= List of things named after Kazimierz Kuratowski =

This is a (partial) list of things named after Kazimierz Kuratowski, a 20th-century Polish mathematician and logician associated with the Warsaw School of Mathematics:

== Mathematics ==
- Kuratowski's theorem
- Kuratowski closure axioms
- Kuratowski convergence
- Kuratowski–Zorn lemma
- Kuratowski's closure-complement problem
- Kuratowski's intersection theorem
- Kuratowski embedding
- Kuratowski–Ulam theorem
- Kuratowski-finite
- Kuratowski and Ryll-Nardzewski measurable selection theorem
- Knaster–Kuratowski–Mazurkiewicz lemma
- Kuratowski's free set theorem
- Knaster–Kuratowski fan

== Logic ==
- Tarski–Kuratowski algorithm

== Other ==
- Kuratowski Prize
- 26205 Kuratowski, a minor planet
