= Katok =

Katok may refer to:

== Places ==
- Kampong Katok, a village in Brunei
- Katok, Afghanistan, a village in Bamyan Province, Afghanistan

== People ==
- Anatole Katok (1944–2018), American mathematician
- Katok Tsewang Norbu (1698–1755), Tibetan Lama
- Svetlana Katok (born 1947), Russian mathematician
- Wak Katok, character of the Indonesian novel Harimau! Harimau!

== Other uses ==
- Gorodskoi Katok, ice rink in Bishkek, Kyrgyzstan
- Katok Mga Msis!, Philippine television talk show
- Katok Monastery, Tibetan Buddhist monastery in Sichuan, China
