= Kazimierz Kuratowski =

Polish mathematician and logician (1896–1980)

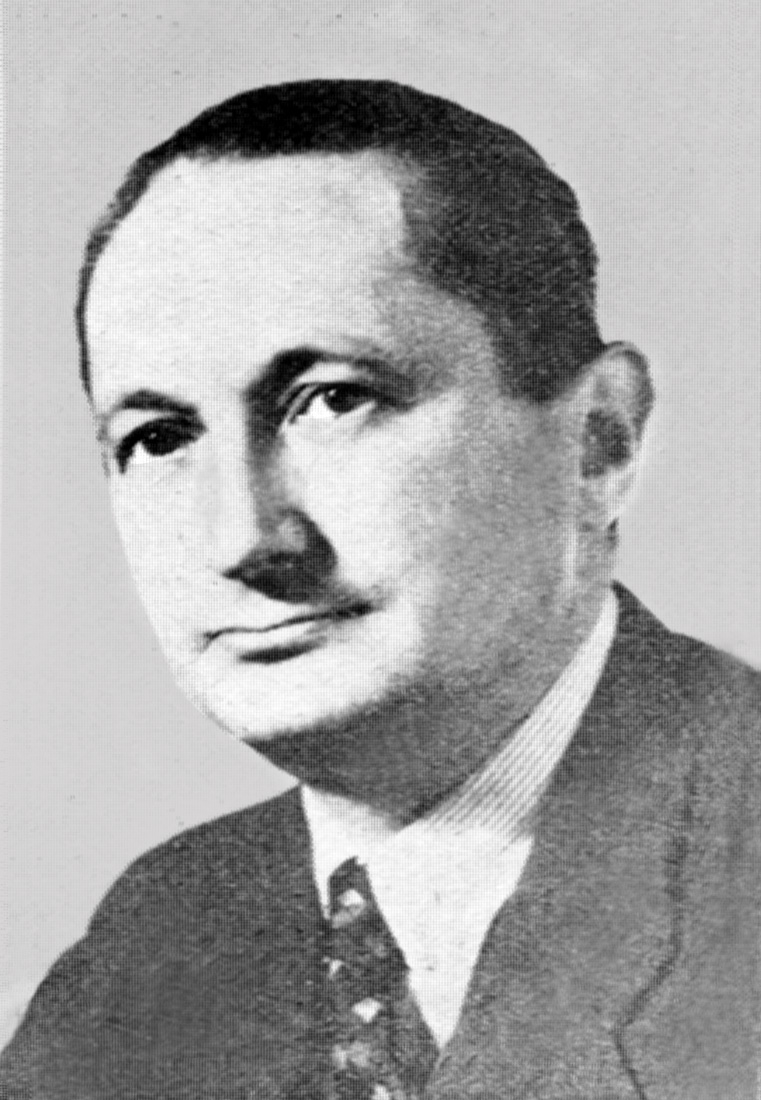
- Kuratowski in 1959
- Born: 2 February 1896; Warsaw, Congress Poland, Russian Empire
- Died: 18 June 1980 (aged 84); Warsaw, Poland
- Education: University of Warsaw
- Known for: Kuratowski's theorem Kuratowski closure axioms Kuratowski–Zorn lemma Kuratowski's closure-complement problem Kuratowski's intersection theorem Kuratowski convergence Kuratowski embedding Kuratowski–Ulam theorem Kuratowski-finite; Kuratowski and Ryll-Nardzewski measurable selection theorem Knaster–Kuratowski–Mazurkiewicz lemma Tarski–Kuratowski algorithm Ordered pair
- Scientific career
- Fields: Mathematics, logic
- Workplaces: University of Warsaw
- Doctoral advisor: Stefan Mazurkiewicz; Zygmunt Janiszewski
- Doctoral students: Samuel Eilenberg; Andrzej Mostowski; Stanislaw Ulam; Ryszard Engelking; Jerzy Jaroń; Józef Krasinkiewicz; Stanisław Mrówka

Kazimierz Kuratowski (Polish pronunciation: [kaˈʑimjɛʂ kuraˈtɔfskʲi]; 2 February 1896 – 18 June 1980) was a Polish mathematician and logician. He was one of the leading representatives of the Warsaw School of Mathematics. He worked as a professor at the University of Warsaw and at the Mathematical Institute of the Polish Academy of Sciences (IM PAN). Between 1946 and 1953, he served as President of the Polish Mathematical Society.

He is primarily known for his contributions to set theory, topology, measure theory and graph theory. Some of the notable mathematical concepts bearing Kuratowski's name include Kuratowski's theorem, Kuratowski closure axioms, Kuratowski-Zorn lemma and Kuratowski's intersection theorem.

== Life and career ==
=== Early life ===
Kazimierz Kuratowski was born in Warsaw, (then part of Congress Poland controlled by the Russian Empire), on 2 February 1896, into an assimilated Jewish family. He was a son of Marek Kuratow, a barrister, and Róża Karzewska. He completed a Warsaw secondary school, which was named after general Paweł Chrzanowski. In 1913, he enrolled in an engineering course at the University of Glasgow in Scotland, in part because he did not wish to study in Russian; instruction in Polish was prohibited. He completed only one year of study when the outbreak of World War I precluded any further enrolment. In 1915, Russian forces withdrew from Warsaw and Warsaw University was reopened with Polish as the language of instruction. Kuratowski restarted his university education there the same year, this time in mathematics. He obtained his Ph.D. in 1921, in the newly established Second Polish Republic.

=== Doctoral thesis ===
In autumn 1921 Kuratowski was awarded the Ph.D. degree for his groundbreaking work. His thesis statement consisted of two parts. One was devoted to an axiomatic construction of topology via the closure axioms. This first part (republished in a slightly modified form in 1922) has been cited in hundreds of scientific articles.

The second part of Kuratowski's thesis was devoted to continua irreducible between two points. This was the subject of a French doctoral thesis written by Zygmunt Janiszewski. Since Janiszewski was deceased, Kuratowski's supervisor was Stefan Mazurkiewicz. Kuratowski's thesis solved certain problems in set theory raised by a Belgian mathematician, Charles-Jean Étienne Gustave Nicolas, Baron de la Vallée Poussin.

=== Academic career until World War II ===
Two years later, in 1923, Kuratowski was appointed deputy professor of mathematics at Warsaw University. He was then appointed a full professor of mathematics at Lwów Polytechnic in Lwów, in 1927. He was the head of the Mathematics department there until 1933. Kuratowski was also dean of the department twice. In 1929, Kuratowski became a member of the Warsaw Scientific Society

While Kuratowski associated with many of the scholars of the Lwów School of Mathematics, such as Stefan Banach and Stanislaw Ulam, and the circle of mathematicians based around the Scottish Café he kept close connections with Warsaw. Kuratowski left Lwów for Warsaw in 1934, before the famous Scottish Book was begun (in 1935), hence did not contribute any problems to it. He did however, collaborate closely with Banach in solving important problems in measure theory.

In 1934 he was appointed the professor at Warsaw University. A year later Kuratowski was nominated as the head of the Mathematics department there. From 1936 to 1939 he was secretary of the Mathematics Committee in The Council of Science and Applied Sciences.

=== During and after the war ===
During World War II, he gave lectures at the underground university in Warsaw, since higher education for Poles was forbidden under German occupation.

In February 1945, Kuratowski started to lecture at the reopened Warsaw University. In 1945, he became a member of the Polish Academy of Learning, in 1946 he was appointed vice-president of the Mathematics department at Warsaw University, and from 1949 he was chosen to be the vice-president of Warsaw Scientific Society. In 1952 he became a member of the Polish Academy of Sciences, of which he was the vice-president from 1957 to 1968.

After World War II, Kuratowski was actively involved in the rebuilding of scientific life in Poland. He helped to establish the State Institute of Mathematics, which was incorporated into the Polish Academy of Sciences in 1952. From 1948 until 1967 Kuratowski was director of the Institute of Mathematics of the Polish Academy of Sciences, and was also a long-time chairman of the Polish and International Mathematics Societies. He served as vice-president of the International Mathematical Union (1963–1966) as well as president of the Scientific Council of the State Institute of Mathematics (1968–1980). From 1948 to 1980 he was the head of the topology section. In 1974, Kuratowski became the inaugural recipient of the Sierpiński Medal conferred jointly by the Polish Mathematical Society and the University of Warsaw. Among his notable students was Andrzej Mostowski.

== Legacy ==
Kazimierz Kuratowski was one of a celebrated group of Polish mathematicians who would meet at Lwów's Scottish Café. He was a president of the Polish Mathematical Society (PTM) and a member of the Warsaw Scientific Society (TNW). What is more, he was chief editor in "Fundamenta Mathematicae", a series of publications in "Polish Mathematical Society Annals". Furthermore, Kuratowski worked as an editor in the Polish Academy of Sciences Bulletin. He was also one of the writers of the Mathematical monographs, which were created in cooperation with the Institute of Mathematics of the Polish Academy of Sciences (IMPAN). High quality research monographs of the representatives of Warsaw's and Lwów's School of Mathematics, which concerned all areas of pure and applied mathematics, were published in these volumes.

Kazimierz Kuratowski was an active member of many scientific societies and foreign scientific academies, including the Royal Society of Edinburgh, Austria, Germany, Hungary, Italy and the Union of Soviet Socialist Republics (USSR).

=== Kazimierz Kuratowski Prize ===
In 1981, IMPAN, the Polish Mathematical Society, and Kuratowski's daughter Zofia Kuratowska established a prize in his name, the Kuratowski Prize, for achievements in mathematics to people under the age of 30 years. The prize is considered the most prestigious of awards for young Polish mathematicians; past recipients have included Józef H. Przytycki, Mariusz Lemańczyk, Tomasz Łuczak, Mikołaj Bojańczyk, and Wojciech Samotij.

== Research ==
Proof without words that a hypercube graph is non-planar using Kuratowski's or Wagner's theorems and finding either K5 (top) or K3,3 (bottom) subgraphs.

Kuratowski's research mainly focused on abstract topological and metric structures. He implemented the closure axioms (known in mathematical circles as the Kuratowski closure axioms). This was fundamental for the development of topological space theory and irreducible continuum theory between two points. The most valuable results, which were obtained by Kuratowski after the war are those that concern the relationship between topology and analytic functions (theory), and also research in the field of cutting Euclidean spaces. Together with Ulam, who was Kuratowski's most talented student during the Lwów Period, he introduced the concept of so-called quasi homeomorphism that opened up a new field in topological studies. Kuratowski's research in the field of measure theory, including research with Banach and Tarski, was continued by many students. Moreover, with Alfred Tarski and Wacław Sierpiński he provided most of the theory concerning Polish spaces (that are indeed named after these mathematicians and their legacy). Knaster and Kuratowski brought a comprehensive and precise study to connected components theory. It was applied to issues such as cutting-plane, with the paradoxical examples of connected components.

Kuratowski proved the Kuratowski-Zorn lemma (often called just Zorn's lemma) in 1922. This result has important connections to many basic theorems. Zorn gave its application in 1935. Kuratowski implemented many concepts in set theory and topology. In many cases, Kuratowski established new terminologies and symbolisms. His contributions to mathematics include:

- a characterization of topological spaces which are now called the Kuratowski closure axioms;
- proof of the Kuratowski–Zorn lemma;
- in graph theory, the characterization of planar graphs now known as Kuratowski's theorem;
- identification of the ordered pair $(x,y)$ with the set $\{\{x\},\{x,y\}\};$
- the Kuratowski finite set definition, see Kuratowski-finite;
- introduction of the Tarski–Kuratowski algorithm;
- Kuratowski's closure-complement problem;
- Kuratowski embedding;
- Kuratowski's free set theorem;
- Kuratowski's intersection theorem;
- Knaster–Kuratowski fan;
- Kuratowski–Ulam theorem;
- Kuratowski convergence of subsets of metric spaces;
- the Kuratowski and Ryll-Nardzewski measurable selection theorem;

Kuratowski's post-war works were mainly focused on three strands:

- The development of homotopy in continuous functions.
- The construction of connected space theory in higher dimensions.
- The uniform depiction of cutting Euclidean spaces by any of its subsets, based on the properties of continuous transformations of these sets.

== Publications ==
Among over 170 published works are valuable monographs and books including Topologie (Vol. I, 1933, translated into English and Russian, and Vol. II, 1950) and Introduction to Set Theory and Topology (Vol. I, 1952, translated into English, French, Spanish, and Bulgarian). He authored "A Half Century of Polish Mathematics 1920-1970: Remembrances and Reflections" (1973) and "Notes to his autobiography" (1981). The latter was published posthumously thanks to Kuratowski's daughter Zofia Kuratowska, who prepared his notes for printing. Kazimierz Kuratowski represented Polish mathematics in the International Mathematical Union where he was vice president from 1963 to 1966. What is more, he participated in numerous international congresses and lectured at dozens of universities around the world. He was an honorary causa doctor at the Universities in Glasgow, Prague, Wroclaw, and Paris. He received the highest national awards, as well as a gold medal of the Czechoslovak Academy of Sciences, and the Polish Academy of Sciences. Kuratowski died on 18 June 1980 in Warsaw.

- Kuratowski, Kazimierz; Mostowski, Andrzej (1976) [1968], Set theory. With an introduction to descriptive set theory, Studies in Logic and the Foundations of Mathematics, vol. 86 (Second ed.), Amsterdam-New York-Oxford: North-Holland Publishing Co., MR 0485384

== See also ==
- List of Polish mathematicians
- Scottish Café
- List of things named after Kazimierz Kuratowski
- Timeline of Polish science and technology
