= Przytycki =

Przytycki (feminine Przytycka) is a Polish surname. Notable people with this name include:

- Feliks Przytycki (born 1951), Polish mathematician, father of Piotr
- Józef H. Przytycki (born 1953), Polish-American mathematician, married to Teresa
- Piotr Przytycki, Polish mathematician, winner of E. H. Moore Research Article Prize, son of Feliks
- Teresa Przytycka (born 1958), Polish-American computational biologist, married to Józef
