= Jerzy Weyman =

Polish-American mathematician

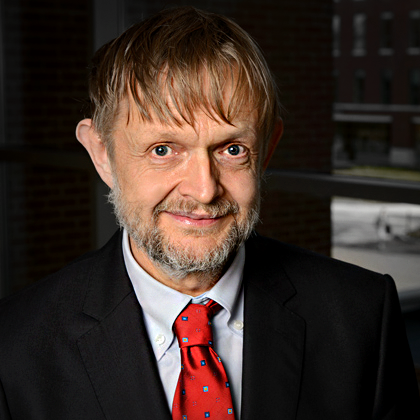
- Born: April 29, 1955; Toruń, Poland
- Education: Nicolaus Copernicus University in Toruń
- Awards: Kuratowski Prize (1984); Humboldt Prize (2015); Sierpiński Medal (2015); International Stefan Banach Prize (2021)
- Scientific career
- Fields: Mathematics
- Workplaces: Northeastern University; University of Connecticut; Jagiellonian University

Jerzy Maria Weyman (Polish pronunciation: [ˈjɛʐɨ ˈveyman]; born April 29, 1955) is a Polish-American mathematician whose field is algebra. With over four decades of professional expertise, he has authored more than 100 publications in peer-reviewed journals and has written two books.

== Biography ==
Weyman was born on April 29, 1955, in Toruń, Poland, into a family with a rich history, including notable figures from Polish history and literature. His maternal great-great-grandfather, Count Aleksander Fredro, was a poet and playwright from the era of Polish Romanticism, while his great-grandfather, Piotr Szembek, served as a military general in the 19th century. Weyman's father's family immigrated to Poland from Alsace in the 19th century, where the surname Weyman is common. Both of Weyman's parents were doctors.

His interest in mathematics began in the 4th grade at IV LO [High School in Toruń, where a teacher inspired him. Enrolling in the Faculty of Mathematics at Nicolaus Copernicus University of Toruń in 1973, Weyman developed a passion for algebra, particularly influenced by his mentor Tadeusz Józefiak. The same year, Weyman won a bronze medal at the International Mathematical Olympiad in Moscow.

In 1977, Weyman defended his master's thesis on ideals generated by monomials. He became an assistant professor at the Mathematical Institute of the Polish Academy of Sciences. He later pursued graduate studies at Brandeis University in the US, completing his Ph.D. in 1980 on free resolutions of determinantal ideals. Weyman returned to Poland in the early 1980s, continuing his role at the Mathematical Institute and collaborating on commutative algebra problems. In 1982, he received the Award of the Polish Mathematical Society for Young Mathematicians, and in 1984, he became a laureate of the Kazimierz Kuratowski Prize along with Piotr Pragacz.

In 1985, Weyman permanently moved to the United States, becoming an assistant professor at Northeastern University of Boston. He rose to the rank of full professor in 1995. His academic journey involved collaborations with renowned mathematicians, such as David Buchsbaum, David Eisenbud, Harm Derksen, Kiyoshi Igusa, Marc Levine, Joseph Landsberg, Gordana Todorov and Andrei Zelevinsky. In 2003, he published his first book, "Cohomology of Vector Bundles and Syzygies." He received the Humboldt Research Award in 2012.

In 2013, Weyman joined the University of Connecticut as the Stuart and Joan Sidney Professor of Mathematics. He contributed to the Commutative Algebra Special Year at MSRI and received the title of professor in Poland. In 2015, he was awarded the Wacław Sierpiński Medal and Lecture. In 2017, Weyman co-authored the book "Introduction to Quiver Representations." After 34 years in the U.S., he returned to Poland in 2019, joining Jagiellonian University. In 2021, he received the Stefan Banach Prize from the Polish Mathematical Society for outstanding achievements in mathematical sciences. Weyman continues his work at Jagiellonian University, leading various research projects, most notably implementing a research grant focused on Applications of Lie algebras to Commutative Algebra, such as Research in commutative algebra and representation theory and Structure of equivariant D-modules.

== Selected research ==
- Akin, Kaan; Buchsbaum, David A.; Weyman, Jerzy (1982). "Schur Functors and Schur Complexes" (PDF). Advances in Mathematics. 44 (3): 207–278. doi:10.1016/0001-8708(82)90039-1.
- Weyman, J. (June 1989). "The equations of conjugacy classes of nilpotent matrices". Inventiones Mathematicae. 98 (2): 229–245. Bibcode:1989InMat..98..229W. doi:10.1007/bf01388851. ISSN 0020-9910. S2CID 123088386.
- Derksen, Harm; Weyman, Jerzy (2000-03-13). "Semi-invariants of quivers and saturation for Littlewood-Richardson coefficients". Journal of the American Mathematical Society. 13 (3): 467–479. doi:10.1090/s0894-0347-00-00331-3. ISSN 0894-0347.
- Derksen, Harm; Weyman, Jerzy; Zelevinsky, Andrei (2008-06-06). "Quivers with potentials and their representations I: Mutations". Selecta Mathematica. 14 (1): 59–119. arXiv:0704.0649. doi:10.1007/s00029-008-0057-9. ISSN 1022-1824. S2CID 16676636.
- Derksen, Harm; Weyman, Jerzy; Zelevinsky, Andrei (2010-02-08). "Quivers with potentials and their representations II: Applications to cluster algebras". Journal of the American Mathematical Society. 23 (3): 749–790. arXiv:0704.0649. doi:10.1090/s0894-0347-10-00662-4. ISSN 0894-0347.
- Weyman, Jerzy (2018). "Generic free resolutions and root systems". Annales de l'Institut Fourier. 68 (3): 1241–1296. arXiv:1609.02083. doi:10.5802/aif.3188. ISSN 0373-0956.

== Books ==
- Weyman, Jerzy (2003). Cohomology of Vector Bundles and Syzygies. Cambridge University Press.
- Derksen, Harm; Weyman, Jerzy M. (2017). An introduction to quiver representations. Graduate studies in mathematics. Providence: American mathematical society. ISBN 978-1-4704-2556-2.

== Awards and recognition ==
=== Research prizes ===
- J. Wacławek Prize of Institute of Mathematics of Polish Academy of Sciences for an outstanding Ph.D. thesis, 1981
- Prize of Polish Mathematical Society for young mathematicians, for papers published in years 1979-1982, 1982
- Prize of the Polish Mathematical Society for young mathematicians, 1982
- M. Wacławek Prize of the Institute of Polish Academy of Sciences, 1982
- Kuratowski Prize of Polish Mathematical Society (joint with Piotr Pragacz), 1983
- Humboldt Forschungspreis, March 2012
- Simons Research Professor, MSRI, January–May, 2013
- Wacław Sierpiński Medal and Lecture, Polish Mathematical Society and Warsaw University, 2015
- Banach Prize of Polish Mathematical Society for scientific achievement, 2021
