= Michael Brin Prize in Dynamical Systems =

Mathematical award

The Michael Brin Prize in Dynamical Systems, abbreviated as the Brin Prize, is awarded to mathematicians who have made outstanding advances in the field of dynamical systems and are within 14 years of their PhD. The prize is endowed by and named after Michael Brin, whose son Sergey Brin is a co-founder of Google. Michael Brin is a retired mathematician at the University of Maryland and a specialist in dynamical systems.

The first prize was awarded in 2008, between 2009 and 2017 it has been awarded bi-annually, and since 2017 annually. Artur Avila, the 2011 awardee, went on to win the Fields Medal in 2014.

From 2016, the Brin prize for young mathematicians is awarded as well, which is given to mathematicians within 4 years of their PhD.

== Past winners ==
- 2008 : Giovanni Forni for his work on area-preserving flows.
- 2009 : Dmitry Dolgopyat for his work on rapid mixing of flows.
- 2011 : Artur Avila for his work on Teichmüller dynamics and interval-exchange transformations.
- 2013 : Omri Sarig for his work on the thermodynamics of countable Markov shifts and his Markov partition for surface diffeomorphisms.
- 2015 : Federico Rodriguez Hertz for his work on geometric and measure rigidity and on stable ergodicity of partially hyperbolic systems.
- 2017 : Lewis Bowen for creation of entropy theory for a broad class of non-amenable groups and solution of the long-standing isomorphism problem for Bernoulli actions of such groups.
- 2018 : Mike Hochman for his work in ergodic theory and fractal geometry.
- 2019 : Sébastien Gouëzel for his work on the spectral theory of transfer operators and statistical properties of hyperbolic dynamical systems and random walks on hyperbolic groups.
- 2020 : Corinna Ulcigrai for her work on the ergodic theory of locally Hamiltonian flows on surfaces and translation flows on periodic surfaces.
- 2021 : Tim Austin for his proof the weak Pinsker conjecture, for his groundbreaking approach to non-conventional multiple ergodic theorems, and his contributions to geometric group theory.
- 2022 : Zhiren Wang for his fundamental contributions to the study of topological and measure rigidity of higher rank actions, and his proof of Moebius disjointness for several classes of dynamical systems.
- 2023 : Jacopo De Simoi for his fundamental contributions to the study of Fermi acceleration, of marked length spectrum rigidity for integrable and dispersing billiards, and entropy rigidity for conservative Anosov flows in dimension 3.
- 2024 : Amir Mohammadi for his fundamental contributions to effective counting and equidistribution in Teichmüller and homogeneous dynamics.
- 2025 : Dan Cristofaro-Gardiner for his for his groundbreaking contributions to symplectic and contact geometry and dynamics.
- 2026 : Dzmitry Dudko for his important contributions to renormalization techniques in complex dynamics with applications to the conjecture of local connectivity of the Mandelbrot set (MLC) and his work on Thurston maps.

== Past winners of the Brin prize for young mathematicians ==
- 2016 : Simion Filip
- 2018 : Alex Wright and Brandon Seward
- 2020 : Joel Moreira
- 2022 : Thibault Lefeuvre and Nicole Looper
- 2024 : Francisco Arana-Herrera and Rohil Prasad

== See also ==
- List of mathematics awards
