= Danijela Damjanović =

Serbian mathematician

Danijela Damjanović is a Serbian mathematician whose research concerns dynamical systems and ergodic theory, particularly focusing on the smooth classification and rigidity of group actions. She is a professor of mathematics in Sweden, at the KTH Royal Institute of Technology in Stockholm.

== Education and career ==
Damjanović studied mathematics as an undergraduate at the University of Belgrade in Serbia, graduating in 1997. She continued her studies at the University of Pennsylvania in the United States, where she completed her Ph.D. in 2004. Her doctoral dissertation, Local Rigidity of Higher Rank Abelian Actions on the Torus via KAM, was supervised by Anatole Katok.

From 2004 to 2006 she was a European Post-Doctoral Institute Fellow, at the Erwin Schrödinger International Institute for Mathematics and Physics in Vienna, Austria, the Institut des hautes études scientifiques in Bures-sur-Yvette, France, the Institute of Mathematics of the Polish Academy of Sciences in Warsaw, Poland, and the Institute for Mathematical Research in Zurich, Switzerland. She continued her postdoctoral research from 2006 to 2009 as a Benjamin Pierce Lecturer in the mathematics department at Harvard University in the United States.

In 2009 she joined Rice University in Houston, Texas, and in 2013 she was tenured there as an associate professor. In 2015 she moved to her present position at KTH, again as an associate professor, and she was promoted to full professor in 2024.

== Recognition ==
Damjanović was an invited speaker at the 2026 International Congress of Mathematicians. She was elected to the Royal Swedish Academy of Sciences in 2026.
