= Dolgopyat =

Dolgopyat (Cyrillic: Долгопят) is a surname. Notable people with the surname include:

- Artem Dolgopyat (born 1997), Israeli gymnast
- Dmitry Dolgopyat (born 1972), Russian-American mathematician
