= Edmund Ryszard Puczyłowski =

Polish mathematician (1948–2021)

- Born: 13 February 1948; Gorczyca
- Died: 19 October 2021 (aged 73)
- Education: University of Warsaw

Edmund Ryszard Puczyłowski (born 13 February 1948 in Gorczyca, died 19 October 2021) was a Polish mathematician and a professor of mathematical sciences. He specialized in algebra (including areas such as ring theory). He was a full professor at the Institute of Mathematics, Faculty of Mathematics, Informatics, and Mechanics of the University of Warsaw (Department of Algebra and Number Theory) and served as the director of the Institute from 2012 to 2015.

== Biography ==
Puczyłowski completed his studies in mathematics at the University of Warsaw in 1972. From 1972 to 1975, he pursued doctoral studies at the same university. In 1975, he defended his doctoral dissertation under the supervision of Adam Suliński and was employed at the University of Warsaw as a senior assistant and, starting in 1977, as an assistant professor. In 1985, he obtained his habilitation degree, and in 1986, he became an associate professor. In 1991, he was appointed an extraordinary professor. He was awarded the title of professor of mathematical sciences in 1995. He was a faculty member of the Faculty of Mathematics, Informatics, and Mechanics of the University of Warsaw, serving as the director of the Institute of Mathematics from 2012 to 2015.

He was a member of the Polish Mathematical Society and the scientific council of the Institute of Mathematics of the Polish Academy of Sciences. From 1998 to 2007, he chaired the main committee of the Mathematical Olympiad.

He published his works in journals such as Proceedings of the American Mathematical Society*, Journal of Algebra and Its Applications, Journal of Pure and Applied Algebra, and Archiv der Mathematik.

He died on 19 October 2021 and was buried in the Municipal Cemetery in Białystok.
