= Cantor's intersection theorem =

On decreasing nested sequences of non-empty compact sets

Cantor's intersection theorem, also called Cantor's nested intervals theorem, refers to two closely related theorems in general topology and real analysis, named after Georg Cantor, about intersections of decreasing nested sequences of non-empty compact sets.

== Topological statement ==
Theorem. Let $S$ be a topological space. A decreasing nested sequence of non-empty compact, closed subsets of $S$ has a non-empty intersection. In other words, supposing $(C_k)_{k \geq 0}$ is a sequence of non-empty compact, closed subsets of S satisfying

$$C_0 \supset C_1 \supset \cdots \supset C_n \supset C_{n+1} \supset \cdots,$$

it follows that

$$\bigcap_{k = 0}^\infty C_k \neq \emptyset.$$

The closedness condition may be omitted in situations where every compact subset of $S$ is closed, for example when $S$ is Hausdorff.

Proof. Assume, by way of contradiction, that ${\textstyle \bigcap_{k = 0}^\infty C_k}=\emptyset$. For each $k$, let $U_k=C_0\setminus C_k$. Since ${\textstyle \bigcup_{k = 0}^\infty U_k}=C_0\setminus {\textstyle \bigcap_{k = 0}^\infty C_k}$ and ${\textstyle \bigcap_{k = 0}^\infty C_k}=\emptyset$, we have ${\textstyle \bigcup_{k = 0}^\infty U_k}=C_0$. Since the $C_k$ are closed relative to $S$ and therefore, also closed relative to $C_0$, the $U_k$, their set complements in $C_0$, are open relative to $C_0$.

Since $C_0\subset S$ is compact and $\{U_k \vert k \geq 0\}$ is an open cover (on $C_0$) of $C_0$, a finite cover $\{U_{k_1}, U_{k_2}, \ldots, U_{k_m}\}$ can be extracted. Let $M=\max_{1\leq i\leq m} {k_i}$. Then ${\textstyle \bigcup_{i = 1}^m U_{k_i}}=U_M$ because $U_1\subset U_2\subset\cdots\subset U_n\subset U_{n+1}\cdots$, by the nesting hypothesis for the collection $(C_k)_{k \geq 0}$. Consequently, $C_0={\textstyle \bigcup_{i = 1}^m U_{k_i}} = U_M$. But then $C_M=C_0\setminus U_M=\emptyset$, a contradiction. ∎

== Alternate version of the topological statement ==
Theorem. Let $S$ be a compact space. A sequence of non-empty nested closed subsets of $S$ has non-empty intersection. This follows immediately from the characterization of compactness as sets for which any family of closed subsets satisfying the finite intersection property has non-trivial intersection.

We can also recover the version above by noting that for subsets of $C_1$, being closed via the Subspace topology with respect to $C_1$ and $S$ are equivalent (because $C_1$ is closed). Then set $S = C_1$.

== Statement for real numbers ==
The theorem in real analysis draws the same conclusion for closed and bounded subsets of the set of real numbers $\mathbb{R}$. It states that a decreasing nested sequence $(C_k)_{k \geq 0}$ of non-empty, closed and bounded subsets of $\mathbb{R}$ has a non-empty intersection.

This version follows from the general topological statement in light of the Heine–Borel theorem, which states that sets of real numbers are compact if and only if they are closed and bounded. However, it is typically used as a lemma in proving said theorem, and therefore warrants a separate proof.

As an example, if $C_k=[0,1/k]$, the intersection over $(C_k)_{k \geq 0}$ is $\{0\}$. On the other hand, both the sequence of open bounded sets $C_k=(0,1/k)$ and the sequence of unbounded closed sets $C_k=[k,\infty)$ have empty intersection. All these sequences are properly nested.

This version of the theorem generalizes to $\mathbf{R}^n$, the set of $n$-element vectors of real numbers, but does not generalize to arbitrary metric spaces. For example, in the space of rational numbers, the sets

$$C_k = [\sqrt{2}, \sqrt{2}+1/k] = (\sqrt{2}, \sqrt{2}+1/k)$$

are closed and bounded, but their intersection is empty.

Note that this contradicts neither the topological statement, as the sets $C_k$ are not compact, nor the variant below, as the rational numbers are not complete with respect to the usual metric.

A simple corollary of the theorem is that the Cantor set is nonempty, since it is defined as the intersection of a decreasing nested sequence of sets, each of which is defined as the union of a finite number of closed intervals; hence each of these sets is non-empty, closed, and bounded. In fact, the Cantor set contains uncountably many points.

Theorem. Let $(C_k)_{k \geq 0}$ be a sequence of non-empty, closed, and bounded subsets of $\mathbb{R}$ satisfying

$$C_0 \supset C_1 \supset \cdots C_n \supset C_{n+1} \cdots.$$

Then,

$$\bigcap_{k = 0}^\infty C_k \neq \emptyset.$$

Proof. Each nonempty, closed, and bounded subset $C_k\subset\mathbb{R}$ admits a minimal element $x_k$. Since for each $k$, we have

$$x_{k+1} \in C_{k+1} \subset C_k,$$
it follows that
$$x_k \le x_{k+1},$$

so $(x_k)_{k \geq 0}$ is an increasing sequence contained in the bounded set $C_0$. The monotone convergence theorem for bounded sequences of real numbers now guarantees the existence of a limit point

$$x=\lim_{k\to \infty} x_k.$$

For fixed $k$, $x_j\in C_k$ for all $j\geq k$, and since $C_k$ is closed and $x$ is a limit point, it follows that $x\in C_k$. Our choice of $k$ is arbitrary, hence $x$ belongs to ${\textstyle \bigcap_{k = 0}^\infty C_k}$ and the proof is complete. ∎

== Variant in complete metric spaces ==
In a complete metric space, the following variant of Cantor's intersection theorem holds.

Theorem. Suppose that $X$ is a complete metric space, and $(C_k)_{k \geq 1}$ is a sequence of non-empty closed nested subsets of $X$ whose diameters tend to zero:

$$\lim_{k\to\infty} \operatorname{diam}(C_k) = 0,$$

where $\operatorname{diam}(C_k)$ is defined by

$$\operatorname{diam}(C_k) = \sup\{d(x,y) \mid x,y\in C_k\}.$$

Then the intersection of the $C_k$ contains exactly one point:

$$\bigcap_{k=1}^\infty C_k = \{x\}$$

for some $x \in X$.

Proof (sketch). Since the diameters tend to zero, the diameter of the intersection of the $C_k$ is zero, so it is either empty or consists of a single point. So it is sufficient to show that it is not empty. Pick an element $x_k\in C_k$ for each $k$. Since the diameter of $C_k$ tends to zero and the $C_k$ are nested, the $x_k$ form a Cauchy sequence. Since the metric space is complete this Cauchy sequence converges to some point $x$. Since each $C_k$ is closed, and $x$ is a limit of a sequence in $C_k$, $x$ must lie in $C_k$. This is true for every $k$, and therefore the intersection of the $C_k$ must contain $x$. ∎

A converse to this theorem is also true: if $X$ is a metric space with the property that the intersection of any nested family of non-empty closed subsets whose diameters tend to zero is non-empty, then $X$ is a complete metric space. (To prove this, let $(x_k)_{k \geq 1}$ be a Cauchy sequence in $X$, and let $C_k$ be the closure of the tail $(x_j)_{j \geq k}$ of this sequence.)

== See also ==
- Kuratowski's intersection theorem
- Helly's theorem - another theorem on intersection of sets.
