= Zhiren Wang =

Chinese mathematician

Zhiren Wang (Chinese: 王之任) is a Chinese mathematician, specializing in dynamical systems. He is known for his contributions to the rigidity theory of group actions.

== Education ==
Wang received his undergraduate education at Fudan University, earning a B.S. in Mathematics (2004). He then pursued graduate studies in France, obtaining an Ingénieur degree from École Polytechnique and a DEA (Diplôme d'études approfondies) in Mathematics from Paris-Sud University (Orsay) (both in 2006). He completed his Ph.D. in Mathematics at Princeton University in 2011 under the supervision of Elon Lindenstrauss.

== Career ==
After completing his doctorate, Wang held a postdoctoral fellowship at the Mathematical Sciences Research Institute, followed by a position as Gibbs Assistant Professor at Yale University from 2011 to 2014, and then faculty positions at Pennsylvania State University from 2014 to 2025. In 2025, he moved to Johns Hopkins University as Professor. He has also held a Von Neumann Fellowship at the Institute for Advanced Study.

== Research ==
Wang's research focuses on several interconnected areas of mathematics: Dynamical systems, classification of group actions and Diophantine approximation and geometry of numbers. His work has made contributions to rigidity theory in dynamical systems. In 2022, Wang received the Michael Brin Prize in Dynamical Systems for his "fundamental contributions to the study of topological and measure rigidity of higher rank actions, and his proof of Möbius disjointness for several classes of dynamical systems."
