= Michael Hochman =

Israeli mathematician

- מיכאל הוכמן
- Education: Hebrew University of Jerusalem
- Known for: Contributions to dynamical systems and ergodic theory
- Awards: Erdős Prize (2015), Michael Brin Prize in Dynamical Systems (2018)
- Scientific career
- Fields: Mathematics
- Workplaces: Hebrew University of Jerusalem
- Doctoral advisor: Benjamin Weiss

Michael Hochman (Hebrew: מיכאל הוכמן) is an Israeli mathematician, currently a professor at the Hebrew University of Jerusalem. He is known for his contributions to dynamical systems and ergodic theory.

Hochman earned his PhD from the Hebrew University of Jerusalem under supervision of Benjamin Weiss in 2007. He published his scientific work in such journals as Annals of Mathematics, Inventiones Mathematicae, and Journal of the European Mathematical Society.

Hochman was an invited speaker at International Congress of Mathematicians in Rio de Janeiro in 2018, and at the conference Dynamics, Equations and Applications in Kraków in 2019.

In 2015, he received the Erdős Prize from the Israel Mathematical Union. In 2018, Hochman was also awarded the Michael Brin Prize in Dynamical Systems.
