= Knots in Washington =

Knots in Washington is an international conference on knot theory and its ramifications held twice a year since 1995. The main organizers are Józef Przytycki, Alexander Shumakovitch, Yongwu Rong and Valentina Harizanov, all of whom are at George Washington University.

This conference has become an important topological event in the Washington Metropolitan Area and regularly attracts well-known topologists from other areas of the US and from other countries. For example, Knots in Washington XVIII, held in May 2004, was the first conference fully devoted to the Khovanov homology, with Mikhail Khovanov giving a series of talks and leading experts Dror Bar-Natan, Lev Rozansky, Oleg Viro, and Ciprian Manolescu giving plenary talks. Knots in Washington XX was dedicated to the 60th birthday of Louis H. Kauffman. Other related conferences include Knots in Poland (1995, 2003), and Knots in Hellas in 1998, where Fields Medal winner Vaughan Jones spoke about his work on knot invariants.

Knots in Washington 50 will take place Dec 6th-8th, 2024 at the George Washington University with updated website: https://blogs.gwu.edu/ccas-knotsinwashington/
