= Zofia Kuratowska =

Polish politician and physician

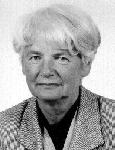

Deputy Marshal of the Senate of Poland
- In office 15 October 1993 – 20 October 1997
- In office 22 November 1989 – 26 November 1991

Poland Ambassador to South Africa
- In office 1997–1999
- Preceded by: Stanisław Cieniuch
- Succeeded by: Krzysztof Śliwiński

Personal details
- Born: 20 July 1931 Skolimów-Konstancin, Poland
- Died: 8 June 1999 (aged 67) Pretoria, South Africa
- Resting place: Powązki Military Cemetery
- Party: Democratic Union, Freedom Union

Zofia Kuratowska (20 July 1931 – 8 June 1999) was a Polish doctor, politician, and diplomat.

== Life and career ==
She was born in 1931 in Skolimów. Her father, Kazimierz Kuratowski, was a mathematician who worked at the Warsaw School of Mathematics. Kuratowska took part in the Warsaw Uprising during World War II. After the war ended, she graduated from the Medical University of Warsaw with a specialty in hematology, and became a doctor. In the 1980s she joined the Solidarity movement and became one of their healthcare workers.

During her time in Solidarity, she took care of over 1,000 political prisoners, and published underground magazines emphasizing their lack of care and inadequate living conditions. During the HIV/AIDS epidemic throughout the 1980s, the government turned to Kuratowska, working with her to prevent the spread of the virus despite having blacklisted her earlier in the decade due to her Solidarity activism. In 1989, she took part in the Polish Round Table Agreement, and from there ran for the Senate in the first democratic elections. She won with 82.5 percent of the vote, the largest margin of any candidate, which she accomplished by saying that she "could not promise anything." In her first term, she was chosen to be Deputy Marshal of the Senate. During this time, she also ran the Hematology Clinic at the Warsaw School of Medicine.

Kuratowska was re-elected to the Senate in 1991 in 1993, serving as Deputy Marshal again during her third term. She served on the Committee on Social Affairs and Health and the Foreign Affairs Committee. After her term ended in 1997, she was nominated to be the ambassador to South Africa, where she spent the rest of her life, dying in 1999.

In 1981, she launched an initiative to establish the Kuratowski Prize in memory of her father Kazimierz Kuratowski. The prize has been awarded annually to young mathematicians under the age of 30 by the Polish Academy of Sciences and the Polish Mathematical Society.

== Honours ==
- Knight's Cross of the Order of Polonia Restituta (1987)
- Commander's Cross of the Order of Polonia Restituta (1990)
- Commander's Cross with Star of the Order of Polonia Restituta (1997)
