= Omri Sarig =

Omri Moshe Sarig (Hebrew: עמרי משה שריג) is an Israeli mathematician specializing in ergodic theory and dynamical systems. He is a professor at the Weizmann Institute of Science, where he holds the Theodore R. and Edlyn Racoosin Professorial Chair in Mathematics. Sarig is known for his contributions to thermodynamic formalism, symbolic dynamics, and the use of transfer operators in non-uniformly hyperbolic dynamics.

== Career ==
Sarig earned his Ph.D. in mathematics from Tel Aviv University in 2001. His doctoral dissertation, Thermodynamic Formalism for Countable Markov Shifts, was supervised by Jon Aaronson.

From 2000 to 2003, he was the Warwick Zeeman Lecturer at the University of Warwick. He then joined Pennsylvania State University, serving first as an assistant professor (2003–2006) and later as an associate professor (2006–2011).

In 2006, Sarig moved to the Weizmann Institute of Science, where he became associate professor in 2009 and full professor in 2014. He served as Head of the Department of Mathematics from 2014 to 2018.

== Research ==
Sarig has developed methods using transfer operators to study countable Markov shifts and symbolic dynamics in smooth ergodic theory. His research also includes results on horocycle flows and multifractal analysis.

== Honors and awards ==
- Michael Brin Prize in Dynamical Systems (2013), "for his work on the thermodynamics of countable Markov shifts and his Markov partition for surface diffeomorphisms with positive topological entropy".
- Erdős Prize (2013), awarded by the Israel Mathematical Union.
- Sloan Research Fellowship (2006).
- Invited Speaker, International Congress of Mathematicians (Hyderabad, 2010) in the section "Dynamical Systems and Ordinary Differential Equations".
