= Lewis Bowen =

American mathematician

Lewis Bowen is an American mathematician and professor at The University of Texas at Austin, where he holds the Jane and Roland Blumberg Centennial Professorship in Mathematics as of 2025. His research focuses on ergodic theory, probability theory, and dynamical systems, with particular emphasis on the ergodic theory of non-amenable group actions and geometric group theory.

== Education ==
Bowen earned both his bachelor's degree (1997) and Ph.D. (2002) from The University of Texas at Austin. His Ph.D. was supervised by Charles Radin.

== Career ==
Before returning to UT Austin in 2012, Bowen held academic positions at several institutions including the University of Hawaiʻi, Texas A&M University, and Indiana University.

== Research ==
Bowen's research interests include:

- Ergodic theory
- Probability theory
- Dynamical systems
- Ergodic theory of non-amenable group actions
- Geometric group theory

== Honors and recognition ==
- Fellow of the American Mathematical Society (inaugural class, 2012)
- Michael Brin Prize in Dynamical Systems (2017) for his "fundamental contributions to measurable and topological dynamics, particularly for non-amenable group actions, invariant random subgroups, and entropy theory"
- Invited speaker at the International Congress of Mathematicians (2018, Rio de Janeiro)
