= Sébastien Gouëzel =

French mathematician (born 1979)

Sébastien Gouëzel (born November 20, 1979) is a French mathematician and a research director at the CNRS (French National Centre for Scientific Research). He is known for his contributions to dynamical systems, ergodic theory, probability theory, and formal mathematics.

== Education and career ==
Gouëzel was educated at the École normale supérieure in Paris from 1998 to 2002. In 2000, he achieved first place in the Agrégation in mathematics. He completed his DEA (master's degree) in pure mathematics at the University of Paris-Sud in 2001 with highest honors, ranking first in his class. His master's thesis, supervised by Viviane Baladi, was titled "Spectrum of the transfer operator in dimension 1."

He earned his PhD in mathematics in 2004 under the supervision of Viviane Baladi, with a dissertation titled "Decorrelation speed and limit theorems for non-uniformly expanding maps."

Gouëzel's academic positions include:

- 2002–2005: Agrégé préparateur at École normale supérieure Paris
- 2005–2009: Research associate (second class) at CNRS, University of Rennes
- 2009–2015: Research associate (first class) at CNRS, University of Rennes
- 2015–2020: Research director (second class) at CNRS, University of Nantes
- 2020–2021: Research director (second class) at CNRS, University of Rennes
- 2021–present: Research director (first class) at CNRS, University of Rennes

== Research ==
Gouëzel's research spans several areas of mathematics, with particular focus on:

=== Dynamical Systems and Ergodic Theory ===
His work includes significant contributions to the study of hyperbolic dynamical systems, transfer operators, and limit theorems for dynamical systems. Notable results include work on the Teichmüller flow and spectral properties of various dynamical systems.

=== Random Walks on Groups ===
Gouëzel has made important contributions to the theory of random walks on hyperbolic groups, including work on Martin boundary theory and local limit theorems.

=== Formal Mathematics ===
He is a major contributor to the Lean theorem prover and maintains the mathematical library mathlib. His formalization work includes differential geometry, the Gromov-Hausdorff distance, and various results in ergodic theory.

== Awards and honors ==
- 2018: Invited speaker at the International Congress of Mathematicians in Rio de Janeiro
- 2019: Michael Brin Prize in Dynamical Systems for his outstanding contributions to dynamical systems, ergodic theory, and geometric group theory
- 2022: Grand Prix Madame Victor Noury from the French Academy of Sciences
