= Measure of non-compactness =

In functional analysis, two measures of non-compactness are commonly used; these associate numbers to sets in such a way that compact sets all get the measure 0, and other sets get measures that are bigger according to "how far" they are removed from compactness.

The underlying idea is the following: a bounded set can be covered by a single ball of some radius. Sometimes several balls of a smaller radius can also cover the set. A compact set in fact can be covered by finitely many balls of arbitrary small radius, because it is totally bounded. So one could ask: what is the smallest radius that allows to cover the set with finitely many balls?

Formally, we start with a metric space M and a subset X. The ball measure of non-compactness is defined as

α(X) = inf {r > 0 : there exist finitely many balls of radius r which cover X}

and the Kuratowski measure of non-compactness is defined as

β(X) = inf {d > 0 : there exist finitely many sets of diameter at most d which cover X}

Since a ball of radius r has diameter at most 2r, we have α(X) ≤ β(X) ≤ 2α(X).

The two measures α and β share many properties, and we will use γ in the sequel to denote either one of them. Here is a collection of facts:

- X is bounded if and only if γ(X) < ∞.
- γ(X) = γ(X^{cl}), where X^{cl} denotes the closure of X.
- If X is compact, then γ(X) = 0. Conversely, if γ(X) = 0 and X is complete, then X is compact.
- γ(X ∪ Y) = max(γ(X), γ(Y)) for any two subsets X and Y.
- γ is continuous with respect to the Hausdorff distance of sets.

Measures of non-compactness are most commonly used if M is a normed vector space. In this case, we have in addition:

- γ(aX) = |a| γ(X) for any scalar a
- γ(X + Y) ≤ γ(X) + γ(Y)
- γ(conv(X)) = γ(X), where conv(X) denotes the convex hull of X

Note that these measures of non-compactness are useless for subsets of Euclidean space R^{n}: by the Heine–Borel theorem, every bounded closed set is compact there, which means that γ(X) = 0 or ∞ according to whether X is bounded or not.

Measures of non-compactness are however useful in the study of infinite-dimensional Banach spaces, for example. In this context, one can prove that any ball B of radius r has α(B) = r and β(B) = 2r.

== See also ==
- Kuratowski's intersection theorem
