= Kiyoshi Igusa =

Japanese-American mathematician

Kiyoshi Igusa (born November 28, 1949) is a Japanese-American mathematician and a professor at Brandeis University. He works in representation theory and topology.

== Education and career ==
He studied at the University of Chicago and Princeton University, where he obtained his Ph.D. in 1979, under the direction of Allen Hatcher and Wu-Chung Hsiang.

From 1981 to 1983, he was a Sloan Fellow, and since 2012 he is a Fellow of the American Mathematical Society.

In 1990, he gave an invited lecture at the International Congress of Mathematicians in Kyoto (Topology Section).

== Personal life ==
Igusa's father, Jun-Ichi Igusa, was also a mathematician. Igusa is married to Gordana Todorov, with whom he is a frequent collaborator.

== Selected publications ==
- Igusa, Kiyoshi; Orr, Kent E. (2001). "Links, pictures and the homology of nilpotent groups". Topology. 40 (6): 1125–1166. doi:10.1016/s0040-9383(00)00002-1. MR 1867241.
- Igusa, Kiyoshi (2002). Higher Franz-Reidemeister torsion. AMS/IP Studies in Advanced Mathematics. Vol. 31. Providence, RI: American Mathematical Society. ISBN 978-0-8218-3170-0. MR 1945530.
- Goette, Sebastian; Igusa, Kiyoshi (2014). "Exotic smooth structures on topological fiber bundles II". Transactions of the American Mathematical Society. 366 (2): 791–832. arXiv:1011.4653. doi:10.1090/s0002-9947-2013-05858-8. MR 3130317.
- Goodwillie, Thomas; Igusa, Kiyoshi; Ohrt, Christopher (2015). "An equivariant version of Hatcher's G/O construction". Journal of Topology. 8 (3): 675–690. arXiv:1307.5554. doi:10.1112/jtopol/jtv015. MR 3394313. S2CID 119733082.
