= Kuratowski's closure-complement problem =

Problem in topology

In point-set topology, Kuratowski's closure-complement problem asks for the largest number of distinct sets obtainable by repeatedly applying the set operations of closure and complement to a given starting subset of a topological space. The answer is 14. This result was first published by Kazimierz Kuratowski in 1922. It gained additional exposure in Kuratowski's fundamental monograph Topologie (first published in French in 1933; the first English translation appeared in 1966) before achieving fame as a textbook exercise in John L. Kelley's 1955 classic, General Topology.

== Proof ==
Letting $S$ denote an arbitrary subset of a topological space, write $kS$ for the closure of $S$, and $cS$ for the complement of $S$. The following three identities imply that no more than 14 distinct sets are obtainable:

1. $kkS=kS$. (The closure operation is idempotent.)
2. $ccS=S$. (The complement operation is an involution.)
3. $kckckckcS=kckcS$. (Or equivalently $kckckckS=kckckckccS=kckS$, using identity (2)).

The first two are trivial. The third follows from the identity $kikiS=kiS$ where $iS$ is the interior of $S$ which is equal to the complement of the closure of the complement of $S$, $iS=ckcS$. (The operation $ki=kckc$ is idempotent.)

A subset realizing the maximum of 14 is called a 14-set. The space of real numbers under the usual topology contains 14-sets. Here is one example:

$$(0,1)\cup(1,2)\cup\{3\}\cup\bigl([4,5]\cap\Q\bigr),$$

where $(1,2)$ denotes an open interval and $[4,5]$ denotes a closed interval. Let $X$ denote this set. Then the following 14 sets are accessible:

1. $X$, the set shown above.
2. $cX=(-\infty,0]\cup\{1\}\cup[2,3)\cup(3,4)\cup\bigl((4,5)\setminus\Q\bigr)\cup(5,\infty)$
3. $kcX=(-\infty,0]\cup\{1\}\cup[2,\infty)$
4. $ckcX=(0,1)\cup(1,2)$
5. $kckcX=[0,2]$
6. $ckckcX=(-\infty,0)\cup(2,\infty)$
7. $kckckcX=(-\infty,0]\cup[2,\infty)$
8. $ckckckcX=(0,2)$
9. $kX=[0,2]\cup\{3\}\cup[4,5]$
10. $ckX=(-\infty,0)\cup(2,3)\cup(3,4)\cup(5,\infty)$
11. $kckX=(-\infty,0]\cup[2,4]\cup[5,\infty)$
12. $ckckX=(0,2)\cup(4,5)$
13. $kckckX=[0,2]\cup[4,5]$
14. $ckckckX=(-\infty,0)\cup(2,4)\cup(5,\infty)$

== Further results ==
Despite its origin within the context of a topological space, Kuratowski's closure-complement problem is actually more algebraic than topological. A surprising abundance of closely related problems and results have appeared since 1960, many of which have little or nothing to do with point-set topology.

Regarded as set-valued set functions, the 14 closure-complement operations comprise an operator monoid called the Kuratowski monoid where the monoid product is function composition. This monoid, which can be used to classify topological spaces based on the quotient they satisfy, has inspired similar classifications in other settings as well.

== See also ==
- Free monoid
