= Corinna Ulcigrai =

Italian mathematician (born 1980)

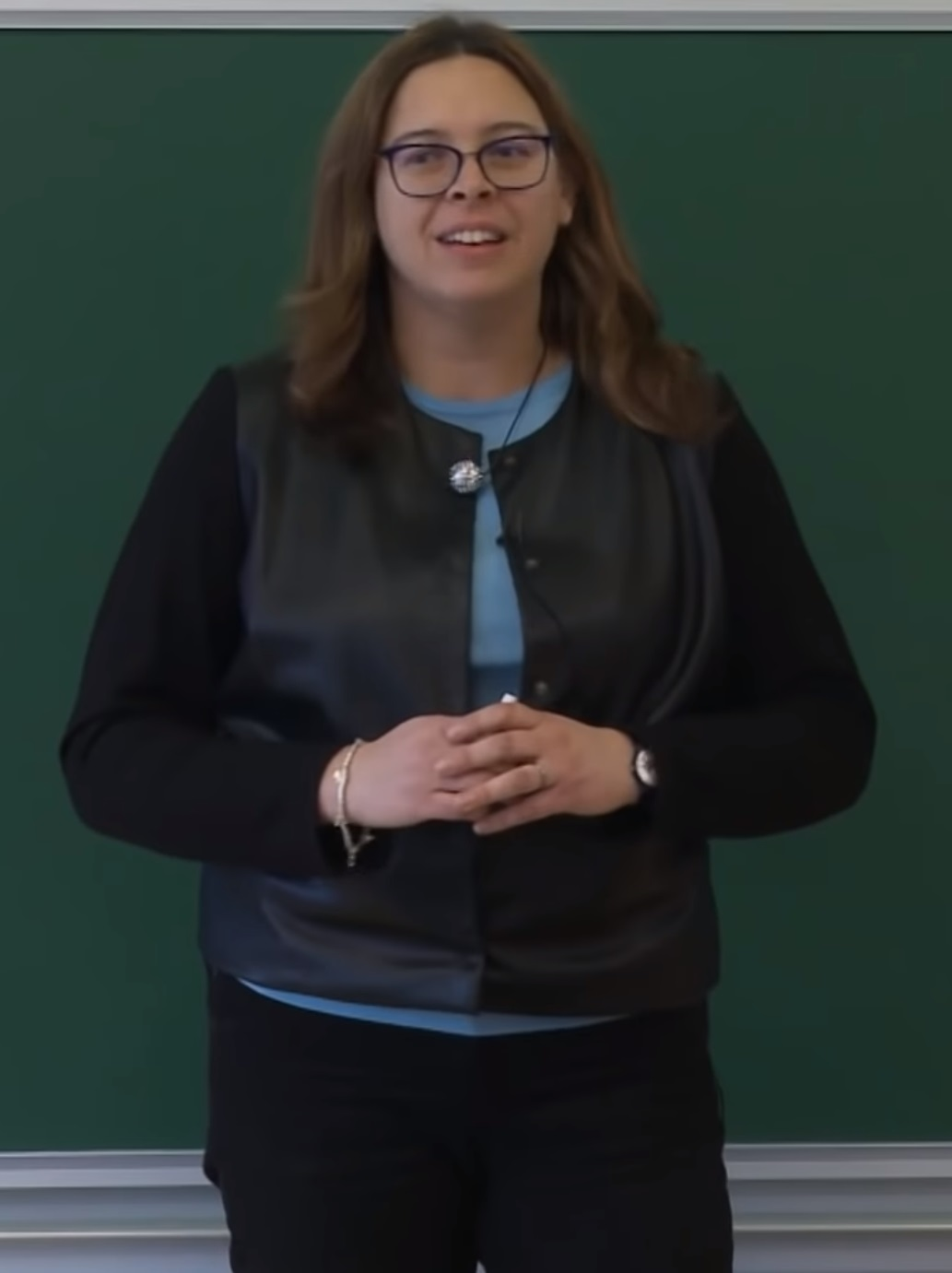
Ulcigrai lectures in 2019

Corinna Ulcigrai (born 3 January 1980, Trieste) is an Italian mathematician working on dynamical systems. With Krzysztof Frączek in 2013, Ulcigrai is known for proving that in the Ehrenfest model (a mathematical abstraction of billiards with an infinite array of rectangular obstacles, used to model gas diffusion) most trajectories are not ergodic.

== Education and career ==
Ulcigrai obtained her Ph.D. in 2007 from Princeton University with Yakov Sinai as her thesis advisor. She has worked at the University of Bristol, United Kingdom. and is currently a professor at the University of Zurich, Switzerland.

== Recognition ==
Ulcigrai was awarded the European Mathematical Society Prize in 2012, and the Whitehead Prize in 2013.

In 2020, Ulcigrai was the winner of the Michael Brin Prize in Dynamical Systems, "for her fundamental work on the ergodic theory of locally Hamiltonian flows on surfaces, of translation flows on periodic surfaces and wind-tree models, and her seminal work on higher genus generalizations of Markov and Lagrange spectra".
