= Tomasz Łuczak =

Polish mathematician

Tomasz Łuczak (born 13 March 1963 in Poznań) is a Polish mathematician and professor at Adam Mickiewicz University in Poznań and Emory University. His main field of research is combinatorics, specifically discrete structures, such as random graphs, and their chromatic number.

Under supervision of Michał Karoński, Łuczak earned his doctorate at Adam Mickiewicz University in Poznań in 1987. In 1991, he received the Kuratowski Prize and the following year, he was awarded the EMS Prize. In 1997, he won the prestigious Prize of the Foundation for Polish Science for his work on the theory of random discrete structures. In 2018, Łuczak received the Sierpiński Medal awarded jointly by the Polish Mathematical Society and the University of Warsaw.
