= Teresa Przytycka =

Polish-American computational biologist

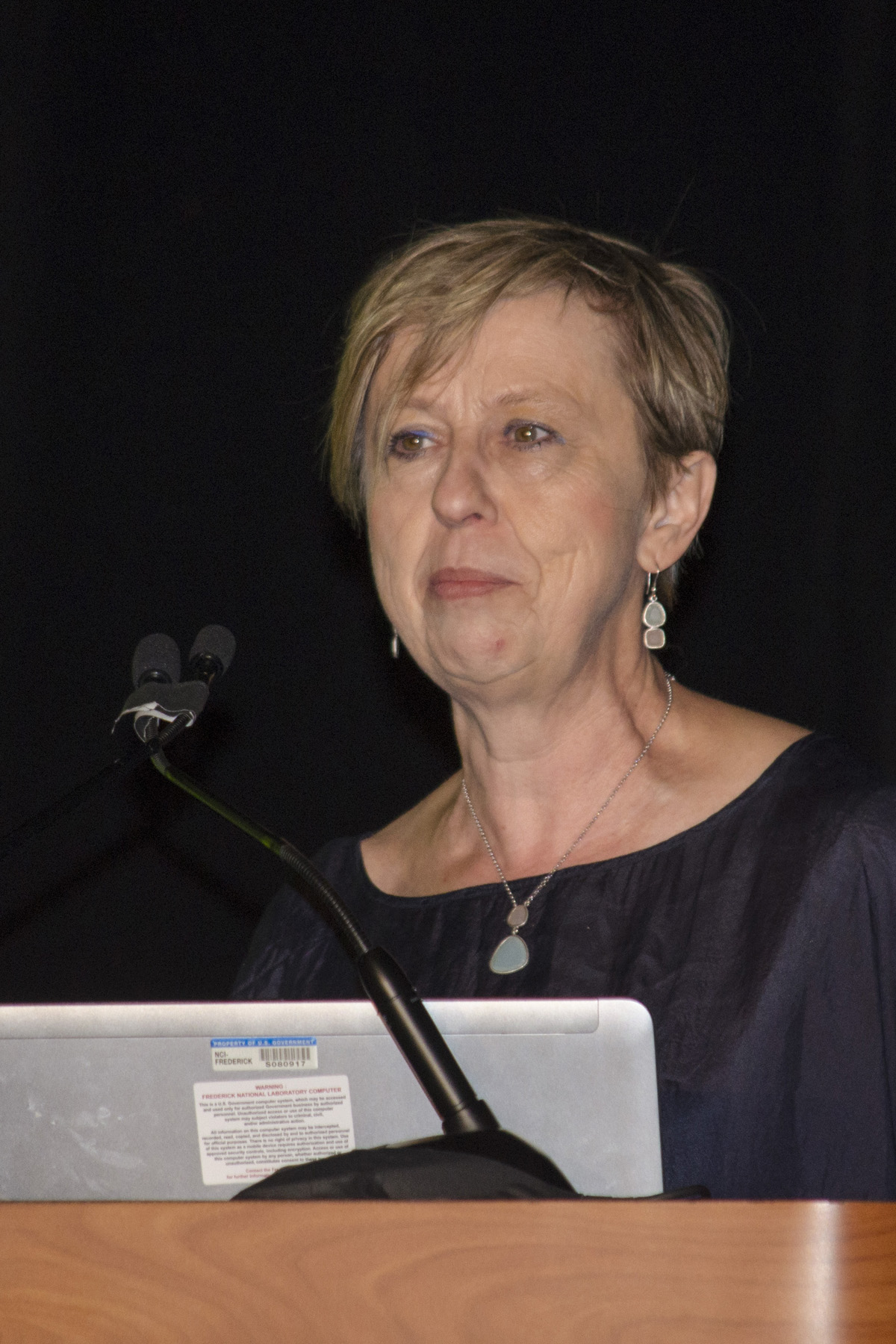
Teresa Przytycka in 2016

Teresa Maria Przytycka (born 1958) is a Polish-American computational biologist who works as a senior investigator in the Computational Biology Branch of the National Center for Biotechnology Information (NCBI), where she heads the Algorithmic Methods in Computational and Systems Biology (AlgoCSB) section. She started her research career in parallel algorithms; at the NCBI, her research takes a computational approach to problems in systems biology involving cancer, gene regulation, and the analysis of massive data.

== Education and career ==
Przytycka is originally from Myszków; her parents, native of the village Gorajec in eastern Poland, were well-educated in part through the Polish underground education. She studied mathematics and computer science at the University of Warsaw, earning a master's degree there in 1982. She stayed at the university as a researcher, but took leave to become a doctoral student at the University of British Columbia (UBC), following her husband, Józef H. Przytycki, who had taken a postdoctoral position there; she completed her Ph.D. at UBC in 1990. Her dissertation, Parallel Algorithms On Trees And Related Problems, concerned parallel algorithm design, and was supervised by David G. Kirkpatrick.

Although originally intending to return to her position at the University of Warsaw, that became impracticable because of her two new children and the lack of adequate childcare in Warsaw at that time. After a visiting assistant professorship at the University of California, Riverside, she became an assistant professor at Odense University in Denmark in 1992, living for much of this time separately from her husband because of their two-body problem. In the mid-1990s, her husband was tenured at George Washington University on the US east coast, and she determined to find positions nearby, at the same time shifting her research interests to computational biology. In 1997 she became a Sloan-DOE research fellow at the Johns Hopkins School of Medicine, where she continued as a Burroughs Wellcome Fellow and research associate. In 2003 she took her present position at the National Center for Biotechnology Information.

== Recognition ==
In 2021 Przytycka was named a Fellow of the International Society for Computational Biology, "for her fundamental algorithmic contributions to a wide range of problems in computational systems biology, especially in network analysis, network-based approaches to uncover disease genes, network reconstruction, regulatory roles of DNA conformation dynamics and RNA aptamer analysis".
