= Dmitry Dolgopyat =

Russian-American mathematician (born 1972)

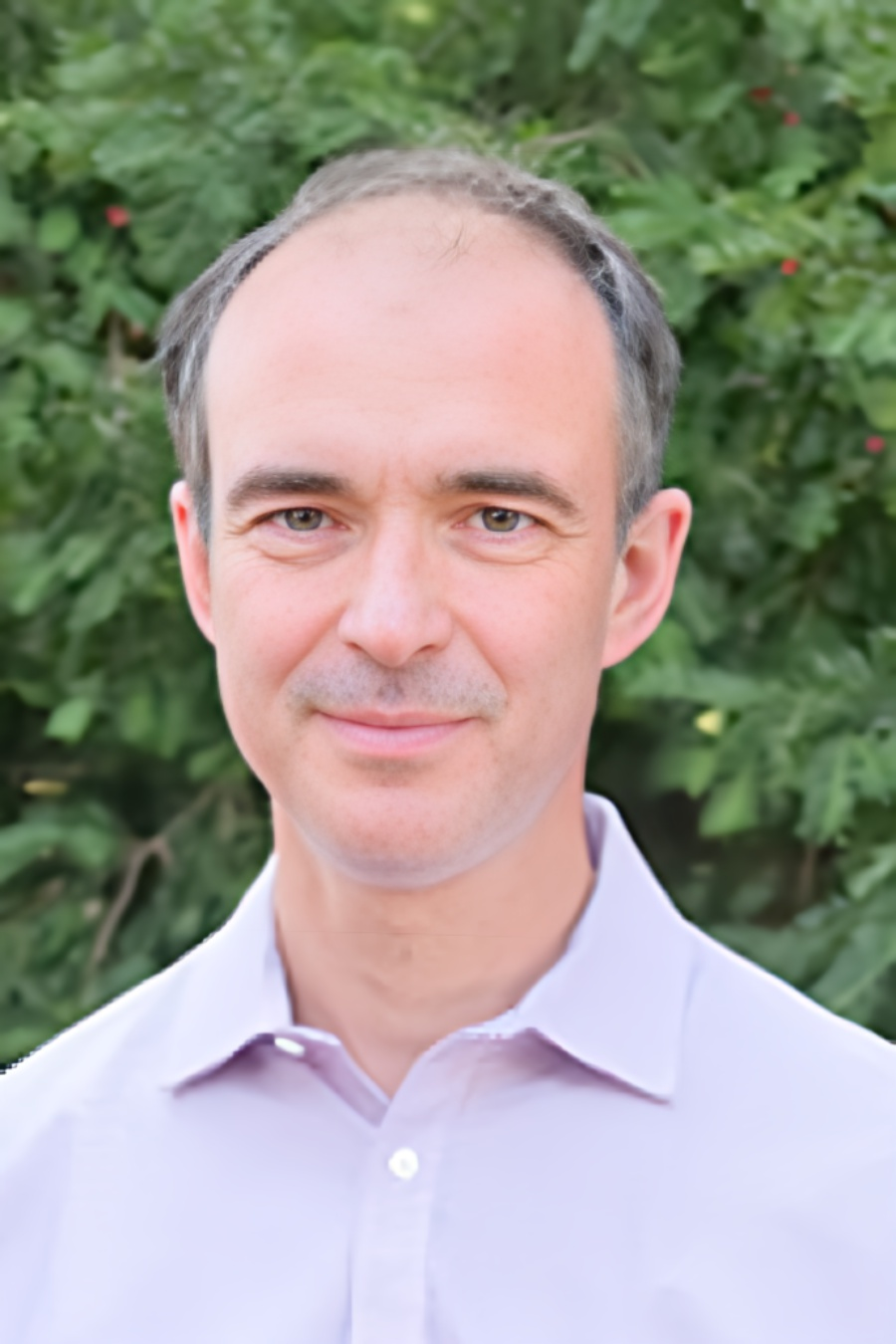
- Dmitry Dolgopyat
- Born: November 1, 1972 (age 53); Moscow, RSFSR, USSR
- Education: Moscow State University; Princeton University
- Awards: Michael Brin Prize in Dynamical Systems (2009); Annales Henri Poincaré (2009); Academia Europaea foreign member (2020); Distinguished University of Maryland Professor (2022)
- Scientific career
- Fields: Mathematics, Mathematical Physics
- Workplaces: University of Maryland, Penn State University, University of Toronto
- Doctoral advisor: Yakov Sinai

Dmitry Ilyich Dolgopyat (Russian: Дмитрий Ильич Долгопят; born November 1, 1972) is a Russian-American mathematician specializing in dynamical systems, a field that studies the time evolution of natural and abstract systems. An internationally acclaimed lecturer, he holds the position of Distinguished University Professor at the University of Maryland, and is a foreign member of the Academia Europaea.

== Education ==
Dolgopyat graduated from Moscow State School 57 mathematical class in 1989.

From 1989 to 1994, he was an undergraduate student at Moscow State University.

From 1994 to 1997, Dolgopyat was enrolled at Princeton University, where he earned a PhD under the guidance of Yakov Sinai.

== Career ==
From September 1999 to June 2003, Dolgopyat served as an assistant professor at Penn State University.

Dolgopyat joined the University of Maryland as an associate professor from September 2002 to June 2006. During this period, he also spent a year at the Institute for Advanced Study (IAS) in Princeton (2002-2003).

He briefly returned to Penn State University as a professor from September 2006 to June 2007 before settling at the University of Maryland as a professor in September 2007, a position he holds to the present day.

Additionally, Dolgopyat spent a year at the University of Toronto and the Fields Institute from 2010 to 2011.

He has also served on the editorial boards of the Journal of Modern Dynamics, Nonlinearity, Ergodic Theory and Dynamical Systems, Annales Henri Poincaré, and the Journal of the American Mathematical Society, as well as on the Prize Committee of the International Bolyai Prize Committee.

== Recognition ==
Dolgopyat was named a Distinguished University Professor in 2022 - the highest academic honor bestowed by the University of Maryland.

In 2020, he was elected a foreign member of the Academia Europaea - a pan-European Academy of Humanities, Letters, Law, and Sciences.

In 2009, he was awarded the Michael Brin Prize in Dynamical Systems for his fundamental contributions to the theory of hyperbolic dynamics.

In 2009, Dolgopyat received the Annales Henri Poincaré Prize for the article Unbounded Orbits for Semicircular Outer Billiard coauthored with Bassam Fayad.

Earlier academic honors included the Sloan Fellowship (Fall 2000 - Spring 2002) and the Miller Fellowship (Fall 1997 - Spring 1999).

== Guest Lectures and Academic Visits ==
Dolgopyat was an invited speaker at the 2003 International Congress on Mathematical Physics in Lisbon, at the 2006 International Congress of Mathematicians in Madrid, plenary speaker at the 2006 Canadian Mathematical Society Winter Meeting in Toronto, 2009 International Workshop Dynamics Beyond Uniform Hyperbolicity at the Beijing International Center for Mathematical Research, and at the 2012 International Congress in Mathematical Physics in Aalborg, Denmark. delivered mini-courses at the International Centre for Theoretical Physics in Trieste, Italy, and at the Centro di Ricerca Matematica Ennio De Giorgi in Pisa Italy.

Other longer mini-courses included DANCE (Dynamics, Attractors, Nonlinearity, Chaos & Stability) Winter School in Murcia, Spain, Program on Hyperbolic Dynamics in Vienna, School on Dynamics & Complexity at the University of the Republic (Uruguay), Special trimester on dynamical systems in Pisa, Dynamics Beyond Uniform Hyperbolicity in Evanston, with shorter visits to Manchester University, United Kingdom, Centro de Investigacion en Matematicas, Guanajuato, Mexico, Hebrew University, Jerusalem, Israel, Newton Institute, Cambridge, United Kingdom, Instituto de Matematica Pura e Aplicada, Rio de Janeiro, Brazil, Northwestern University, Evanston, Illinois, Scuola Normale, Pisa, Ecole Polytechnique, ETH, Zurich, IAS, Princeton, CalTech, Research Institute for Mathematical Sciences, Kyoto, Institut Henri Poincaré, Paris, Erwin Schroedinger Institute, Vienna, Centre International de Rencontres Mathématiques, Luminy, France, University of Toronto/ Fields Institute, University of Bristol, EPFL, Lausanne, Switzerland, Weizmann institute, Israel, Institute for Computational and Experimental Research in Mathematics, Providence, RI.
