= Knaster–Kuratowski fan =

Topological space that becomes totally disconnected with the removal of a single point

The Knaster–Kuratowski fan

In topology, a branch of mathematics, the Knaster–Kuratowski fan (named after Polish mathematicians Bronisław Knaster and Kazimierz Kuratowski) is a specific connected topological space with the property that the removal of a single point makes it totally disconnected. It is also known as Cantor's leaky tent (after Georg Cantor).

The same space with the apex point removed is called the punctured Knaster-Kuratowski fan or Cantor's teepee.

== Construction ==
To construct the fan start with the Cantor set which we will call $C$ along the x axis and a point at $\left(\tfrac1{2},\tfrac1{2}\right)$ which we will call $p$. Join every point in $C$ to $p$ with a straight line. We now have a set that is connected and becomes disconnected if we remove $p$.

To make the set totally disconnected when we remove $p$ we need to remove more points. If we look at how the Cantor set $C$ was constructed we see that some points in $C$ like $\tfrac1{3}$ or 1 were the endpoints of intervals we removed when constructing it and others like $\tfrac1{4}$ are not. We use this to decide which of the points we remove from every line. If the point at the bottom of a line (which will be part of $C$) is one of the points that was an end point of an interval we remove all coordinates with irrational y coordinates. Otherwise we remove all points on the line with rational y coordinates. This set is the Knaster–Kuratowski fan.

== Properties ==
The fan is connected but becomes totally disconnected if we remove $p$.

The proof of connectedness (that you cannot divide the fan into 2 open disjoint sets) is not trivial but can be thought of as starting with $p$ in one of the sets and then having to add a little region around $p$ to make the set open. You then need to add a little region around each of the points you added making the set slightly bigger. This continues until the whole fan is in the set

To show that the fan is totally disconnected when you remove $p$ you can start by noticing that each of the lines is now disconnected and then carry on splitting each of the lines down until you are left with individual points.

== See also ==
- Antoine's necklace
- Cone (topology)
