= Katok, Afghanistan =

Katok
- Location in Afghanistan
- Coordinates: 34°43′N 67°40′E
- Country: Afghanistan
- Province: Bamyan Province
- Time zone: + 4.30

Katok is a village in Bamyan Province in central Afghanistan.

== See also ==
- Bamyan Province
