= Svetlana Katok =

Russian–American mathematician

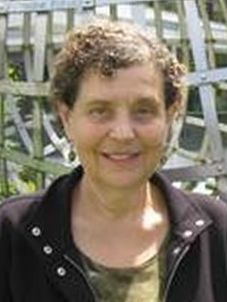
At Oberwolfach, 2009

Svetlana Katok (born May 1, 1947) is a Russian-American mathematician and a professor of mathematics at Pennsylvania State University.

== Education and career ==
Katok grew up in Moscow, and earned a master's degree from Moscow State University in 1969; however, due to the antisemitic and anti-intelligentsia policies of the time, she was denied admission to the doctoral program there and instead worked for several years in the area of early and secondary mathematical education. She immigrated to the US in 1978, and earned her doctorate from the University of Maryland, College Park in 1983 under the supervision of Don Zagier. She joined the Pennsylvania State University faculty in 1990.

Katok founded the Electronic Research Announcements of the American Mathematical Society in 1995; it was renamed in 2007 to the Electronic Research Announcements in Mathematical Sciences, and she remains its managing editor.

Katok was an American Mathematical Society (AMS) Council member at large.

== Books ==
Katok is the author of:

- Fuchsian Groups, Chicago Lectures in Mathematics, University of Chicago Press, 1992. Russian edition, Faktorial Press, Moscow, 2002.
- p-adic Analysis Compared with Real, Student Mathematical Library, vol. 37, American Math. Soc., 2007. Russian edition, MCCME Press, Moscow, 2004.

Additionally, she coedited the book MASS Selecta: Teaching and learning advanced undergraduate mathematics (American Math. Soc., 2003).

== Awards and honors ==
Katok was the 2004 Emmy Noether Lecturer of the Association for Women in Mathematics. In 2012 she and her husband, mathematician Anatole Katok, both became fellows of the American Mathematical Society.
