= Journal of Modern Dynamics =

- Discipline: Mathematics
- Language: English
- Edited by: Giovanni Forni

Publication details
- History: 2007–present
- Publisher: American Institute of Mathematical Sciences (United States)
- Frequency: Continuous

Standard abbreviations
- ISO 4: J. Mod. Dyn.
- MathSciNet: J. Mod. Dyn.

Indexing
- ISSN: 1930-5311 (print); 1930-532X (web)
- LCCN: 2006214428
- OCLC no.: 64573835

Links
- Journal homepage

The Journal of Modern Dynamics is a peer-reviewed scientific journal of mathematics published by the American Institute of Mathematical Sciences with the support of the Anatole Katok Center for Dynamical Systems and Geometry (Pennsylvania State University). The editor-in-chief is Giovanni Forni (University of Maryland College Park).

== History ==
The journal was established in 2007 with Anatole Katok as the founding editor-in-chief. It covers the theory of dynamical systems with particular emphasis on the mutual interaction between dynamics and other major areas of mathematical research: number theory, symplectic geometry, differential geometry, rigidity, quantum chaos, Teichmüller theory, geometric group theory, and harmonic analysis on manifolds. Until 2015 the journal was published quarterly. Since then, accepted papers are published online first and a single printed volume is published yearly.

== Abstracting and indexing ==
The journal is abstracted and indexed in:

- Current Contents/Physical, Chemical & Earth Sciences
- EBSCO databases
- MathSciNet
- Science Citation Index Expanded
- Scopus
- Zentralblatt MATH

According to MathSciNet, the journal has a 2018 Mathematical Citation Quotient of 0.89.
