= Kuratowski's intersection theorem =

Theorem in topology

In mathematics, Kuratowski's intersection theorem is a result in general topology that gives a sufficient condition for a nested sequence of sets to have a non-empty intersection. Kuratowski's result is a generalisation of Cantor's intersection theorem. Whereas Cantor's result requires that the sets involved be compact, Kuratowski's result allows them to be non-compact, but insists that their non-compactness "tends to zero" in an appropriate sense. The theorem is named for the Polish mathematician Kazimierz Kuratowski, who proved it in 1930.

== Statement of the theorem ==
Let (X, d) be a complete metric space. Given a subset A ⊆ X, its Kuratowski measure of non-compactness α(A) ≥ 0 is defined by

$$\alpha(A) = \inf \left\{ r \geq 0 \left| \begin{array}{c} A \text{ can be covered by finitely many subsets} \\ \text{of } X \text{, each with diameter at most } r \end{array} \right. \right\}.$$

Note that, if A is itself compact, then α(A) = 0, since every cover of A by open balls of arbitrarily small diameter will have a finite subcover. The converse is also true: if α(A) = 0, then A must be precompact, and indeed compact if A is closed. Also, if A is a subset of B, then α(A) ≤ α(B). In some sense, the quantity α(A) is a numerical description of "how non-compact" the set A is.

Now consider a sequence of sets A_{n} ⊆ X, one for each natural number n. Kuratowski's intersection theorem asserts that if these sets are non-empty, closed, decreasingly nested (i.e. A_{n+1} ⊆ A_{n} for each n), and α(A_{n}) → 0 as n → ∞, then their infinite intersection

$$\bigcap_{n \in \mathbb{N}} A_{n}$$

is a non-empty compact set.

The result also holds if one works with the ball measure of non-compactness or the separation measure of non-compactness, since these three measures of non-compactness are mutually Lipschitz equivalent; if any one of them tends to zero as n → ∞, then so must the other two.
