= Tarski–Kuratowski algorithm =

In computability theory and mathematical logic the Tarski–Kuratowski algorithm is a non-deterministic algorithm that produces an upper bound for the complexity of a given formula in the arithmetical hierarchy and analytical hierarchy.

The algorithm is named after Alfred Tarski and Kazimierz Kuratowski.

== Algorithm ==
The Tarski–Kuratowski algorithm for the arithmetical hierarchy consists of the following steps:

1. Convert the formula to prenex normal form. (This is the non-deterministic part of the algorithm, as there may be more than one valid prenex normal form for the given formula.)
2. If the formula is quantifier-free, it is in $\Sigma^0_0$ and $\Pi^0_0$.
3. Otherwise, count the number of alternations of quantifiers; call this k.
4. If the first quantifier is ∃, the formula is in $\Sigma^0_{k+1}$.
5. If the first quantifier is ∀, the formula is in $\Pi^0_{k+1}$.
