= Gordana Todorov =

Mathematician

Gordana Todorov (born July 24, 1949) is a mathematician working in noncommutative algebra, representation theory, Artin algebras, and cluster algebras. She is a professor of mathematics at Northeastern University.

== Biography ==
Todorov earned her Ph.D. in 1978, at Brandeis University. Her dissertation, Almost Split Sequences in the Representation Theory of Certain Classes of Artin Algebras, was supervised by Maurice Auslander.

Todorov is married to mathematician Kiyoshi Igusa. The Igusa–Todorov functions and Igusa–Todorov endomorphism algebras are named for their joint work. Todorov is also the namesake of Todorov's theorem on preprojective partitions, and the Gentle–Todorov theorem on abelian categories.
