= Kuratowski–Ulam theorem =

Analog of Fubini's theorem for arbitrary second countable Baire spaces

In mathematics, the Kuratowski–Ulam theorem, introduced by Kazimierz Kuratowski and Stanislaw Ulam (1932), called also the Fubini theorem for category, is an analog of Fubini's theorem for arbitrary second countable Baire spaces.

Let X and Y be second countable Baire spaces (or, in particular, Polish spaces), and let $A \subset X \times Y$. Then the following are equivalent if A has the Baire property:

1. A is meager (respectively comeager).
2. The set $\{ x \in X :A_x \text{ is meager (resp. comeager) in }Y \}$ is comeager in X, where $A_x=\pi_Y[A\cap \lbrace x \rbrace \times Y]$, where $\pi_Y$ is the projection onto Y.

Even if A does not have the Baire property, 2. follows from 1. Note that the theorem still holds (perhaps vacuously) for X an arbitrary Hausdorff space and Y a Hausdorff space with countable π-base.

The theorem is analogous to the regular Fubini's theorem for the case where the considered function is a characteristic function of a subset in a product space, with the usual correspondences, namely, meagre set with a set of measure zero, comeagre set with one of full measure, and a set with the Baire property with a measurable set.
