= Kuratowski Prize =

Polish mathematics prize

- Awarded for: achievements in mathematics by young mathematicians under the age of 30
- Country: Poland
- Presented by: Polish Academy of Sciences; Polish Mathematical Society
- First award: 1981
- Website: www.impan.pl/en/activities/awards/kazimierz-kuratowski

The Kuratowski Prize (Polish: Nagroda im. Kazimierza Kuratowskiego) is a Polish annual mathematics award conferred jointly by the Polish Academy of Sciences (PAN) and the Polish Mathematical Society (PTM) for contributions in the field of mathematics granted to individuals under the age of 30. It is named in honour of Polish mathematician and logician Kazimierz Kuratowski (1896–1980).

== Description and history ==
The prize was established in 1981 on the initiative of physician and politician Zofia Kuratowska, who was personally the daughter of Kazimierz Kuratowski. It is presented annually by the Institute of Mathematics of the Polish Academy of Sciences and the Polish Mathematical Society (Polskie Towarzystwo Matematyczne). The Kuratowski Prize ceremony takes place during the scientific session of the Polish Mathematical Society and the laureate of the prize is invited to give a speech on a chosen subject. It is considered the most prestigious award for young mathematicians in Poland.

In 2015, Joanna Kułaga-Przymus became the first woman to be awarded the prize. As of 2026, there have been two women mathematicians to receive this recognition, the other being Agnieszka Hejna (2023).

Notable laureates of the prize have included two Prize of the Foundation for Polish Science winners: Mariusz Lemańczyk (1987) and Tomasz Łuczak (1997); Erdős Prize winner Wojciech Samotij (2013); and Stefan Banach Prize winner Jerzy Weyman (1984).

== Laureates ==
The list of recipients of the Kuratowski Prize:

- Maciej Kucharski (2026)
- Juliusz Banecki (2025)
- Borys Kuca (2024)
- Agnieszka Hejna (2023)
- Jakub Skrzeczkowski (2022)
- Wojciech Górny, Marcin Sroka (2021)
- Mateusz Wasilewski (2020)
- Joachim Jelisiejew (2019)
- Piotr Pokora (2018)
- Adam Kanigowski (2017)
- Piotr Achinger (2016)
- Joanna Kułaga-Przymus, Mateusz Michałek (2015)
- Kamil Kaleta (2014)
- Wojciech Samotij (2013)
- Mateusz Kwaśnicki (2012)
- Piotr Przytycki (2011)
- Sławomir Dinew (2010)
- Radosław Adamczak (2009)
- Adam Skalski (2008)
- Mikołaj Bojańczyk (2007)
- Krzysztof Krupiński (2006)
- Grzegorz Bobiński, Tomasz Schreiber (2005)
- Dariusz Buraczewski (2004)
- Piotr Śniady (2003)
- Adrian Langer (2002)
- Grzegorz Zwara (2001)
- Krzysztof Oleszkiewicz (2000)
- Stanisław Kasjan (1999)
- Michał Kwieciński (1998)
- Rafał Latała (1997)
- Jacek Zienkiewicz (1996)
- Piotr Hajłasz, Jerzy Marcinkowski (1995)
- Jacek Graczyk (1994)
- Waldemar Hebisch (1993)
- Zbigniew Jelonek (1992)
- Tomasz Łuczak (1991)
- Jarosław Wiśniewski (1990)
- Adam Parusiński (1989)
- Piotr Biler (1988)
- Mariusz Lemańczyk (1987)
- Krzysztof Ciesielski (1986)
- Marusz Wodzicki (1985)
- Piotr Pragacz, Jerzy Weyman (1984)
- Józef H. Przytycki (1983)
- Ryszard Frankiewicz (1982)
- Feliks Przytycki (1981)

== See also ==
- Prize of the Foundation for Polish Science
- Timeline of Polish science and technology
