= Federico Rodriguez Hertz =

Argentine mathematician (born 1973)

Federico Rodríguez Hertz
- Hertz in 2019
- Born: December 14, 1973 (age 52)
- Education: Instituto de Matemática Pura e Aplicada
- Scientific career
- Fields: Mathematics – dynamical systems
- Workplaces: Pennsylvania State University
- Doctoral advisor: Jacob Palis

Federico Rodríguez Hertz (born December 14, 1973) is an Argentine mathematician working in the United States. He is the Anatole Katok Chair professor of mathematics at Penn State University. Rodriguez Hertz studies dynamical systems and ergodic theory, which can be used to described chaos's behaviors over the large time scale and also has many applications in statistical mechanics, number theory, and geometry.

== Early life and education ==
He is the son of Mariana Frugoni and Adolfo Rodriguez Hertz. He has four siblings, including Jana, a mathematician, teacher and researcher.

Rodriguez Hertz studied at the Universidad Nacional de Rosario in Argentina as an undergraduate student. He moved to Montevideo, Uruguay in 1995, and, unable to continue studies there, he moved in 1996 to Rio de Janeiro where he studied at the graduate school at IMPA and earned a doctoral degree at the IMPA in Brazil in 2001 (with a thesis on "Stable Ergodicity of Toral Automorphisms" under Jacob Palis). His doctoral thesis was published in the Annals of Mathematics and made a breakthrough in this field. After he received his Ph.D., he moved back to Uruguay, where worked at the National University until moving to Penn State.

== Work and research ==
Rodriguez Hertz has published research papers in journals including Annals of Mathematics, Acta Mathematica, Journal of the American Mathematical Society, Inventiones Mathematicae, Contemporary Mathematics, and Journal of Modern Dynamics.

The first important contribution of Federico Rodriguez Hertz is his thesis dealing with stable ergodicity, which established the tools for proving stable ergodicity of non accessible systems. Then jointly with Jana Rodriguez Hertz, Ali Tahzibi and Raul Ures, Federico Rodriguez Hertz has proved a series of deep results about the geometry of Hopf brushes. It has been commented that his work "allows one to bring to the spotlight new powerful tools of rigidity theory, in particular topological and geometric methods". Later, Rodriguez Hertz has researched rigidity theory, which describes the flexibility and motion of sets of rigid bodies. His work in nonuniform-measure rigidity has advanced ergodic theory. A recent work of Aaron Brown and Federico Rodriguez Hertz provides a significant generalization of nonuniform-measure rigidity theory. Another very important work of Rodriguez Hertz is on global rigidity of Anosov actions, joint with Zhiren Wang and joint with Aaron Brown and Zhiren Wang, which has been seen as "the crowning achievements in the work on global rigidity of Anosov actions on tori and nilmanifolds".

Federico Rodriguez Hertz is an editor of the Journal of Modern Dynamics. He has served as a referee for many distinguished peer-reviewed journals, including Annals of Mathematics and Inventiones Mathematicae, and as an evaluator for the Fondo Nacional de Desarrollo Cientifico y Tecnologico, a research foundation promoting science and technology in Chile. He has given invited talks in conferences, workshops and at academic institutions in the United States, Canada, Argentina, Brazil, Uruguay, China, Chile, Poland, Mexico, Germany, Italy, France, Portugal and India.

== Teaching ==
Rodriguez Hertz was a professor of mathematics in the engineering school at the Universidad de la República in Uruguay since 2002. He joined Penn State's Eberly College of Science Department of Mathematics in 2011 as a professor, and holds the Anatole Katok professorship since 2019.

== Honors and recognition ==
In 2005, Rodriguez Hertz received Premio Roberto Caldeyro Barcia Award from Uruguay's Basic Science Development Program. In 2009, he received an award from the Mathematical Union for Latin America and the Caribbean. In 2010 he was an invited speaker at the International Congress of Mathematicians in 2010 in Hyderabad, India. In 2015 he received the Brin Prize in Dynamical Systems. In 2017, Rodriguez Hertz has been selected to receive the Penn State Faculty Scholar Medal for Outstanding Achievement in the Physical Sciences. This award was established in 1980 to "recognize scholarly or creative excellence represented by a single contribution or a series of contributions around a coherent theme".
