= Mariusz Lemańczyk =

Polish mathematician

- Born: 3 February 1958 (age 68); Toruń, Poland
- Education: Nicolaus Copernicus University; University of Warsaw
- Awards: Kuratowski Prize (1987); Stefan Banach Prize (1997); Jean-Morlet Chair, CIRM (2016); Sierpiński Medal (2022)
- Scientific career
- Fields: Mathematics
- Workplaces: Nicolaus Copernicus University
- Thesis: Ergodic Properties of Morse Sequences (1985)
- Doctoral advisor: Jan Kwiatkowski

Mariusz Tomasz Lemańczyk (born 3 February 1958) is a Polish mathematician known for his contributions in ergodic theory and dynamical systems.

== Life and career ==
He graduated from the Nicolaus Copernicus University in Toruń in 1981, in mathematics, and completed his PhD in 1985. In 1987, he received the Kazimierz Kuratowski Prize, considered one of the most prestigious awards for young Polish mathematicians. He received his habilitation at the University of Warsaw in 1991, after which he joined the faculty at Nicolaus Copernicus University. In 1997, he received the Stefan Banach Prize from the Polish Mathematical Society. In 2016, he held the Jean-Morlet Chair at the Centre International de Rencontres Mathématiques. On December 3rd 2021 he was selected to join the Polish Academy of Sciences. In July 2022 he gave an invited lecture entitled 'Furstenberg disjointness, Ratner properties and Sarnak’s conjecture' at the International Congress of Mathematicians.

== See also ==
- List of Polish mathematicians
