= Józef Przytycki =

Polish American mathematician

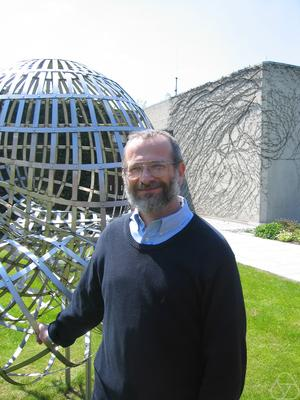
- Przytycki at Oberwolfach in 2008
- Born: October 14, 1953; Warsaw, Poland
- Education: University of Warsaw (MS); Columbia University (PhD)
- Known for: HOMFLYPT polynomial Skein modules
- Spouse: Teresa Przytycka
- Children: 2
- Awards: Kuratowski Prize (1983)
- Scientific career
- Fields: Mathematics
- Workplaces: George Washington University
- Thesis: Incompressible Surfaces in 3-Manifolds (1981)
- Doctoral advisor: Joan Birman
- Website: blogs.gwu.edu/przytyck/

Józef Henryk Przytycki (/ˈjuːsəf pʃəˈtɪski/, Polish: [ˈjuzɛf pʂɨˈtɨt͡skʲi]; born 14 October 1953), is a Polish mathematician specializing in knot theory and topology. He is a professor in the Department of Mathematics at George Washington University.

== Academic background ==
Przytycki received a Master of Science in mathematics from University of Warsaw in 1977 and a PhD in mathematics from Columbia University in 1981, advised by Joan Birman. Przytycki then returned to Poland, where he became an assistant professor at the University of Warsaw. From 1986 to 1995 he held visiting positions at the University of British Columbia, the University of Toronto, Michigan State University, the Institute for Advanced Study in Princeton, New Jersey, the University of California, Riverside, Odense University, and the University of California, Berkeley.

In 1995 Przytycki joined the Mathematics Department at George Washington University in Washington, D.C., where he became a professor in 1999. According to the Mathematics Genealogy Project, he has supervised 16 PhD students as of 2022.

== Research ==
Przytycki has co-authored more than 100 research papers, 25 conference proceedings, and 2 books.

In 1987, Przytycki and Pawel Traczyk published a paper that included a description of what is now called the HOMFLY(PT) polynomial. Postal delays prevented Przytycki and Traczyk from receiving full recognition alongside the other six discoverers. Przytycki also introduced skein modules in a paper published in 1991.

Przytycki has co-organized the conference Knots in Washington each semester since 1995. He also co-organized several international Knot Theory conferences in Europe, including Knots in Poland (1995, 2003 and 2010), Knots in Hellas (1998 and 2016), and the Advanced School and Conference on Knot Theory and its Applications to Physics and Biology, Trieste, Italy (2009).

== Personal life ==
Józef Przytycki is married to computational biologist and mathematician Teresa Przytycka.

== See also ==
- List of Polish mathematicians
