= Anatole Katok =

American mathematician (1944–2018)

- Анатолий Борисович Каток
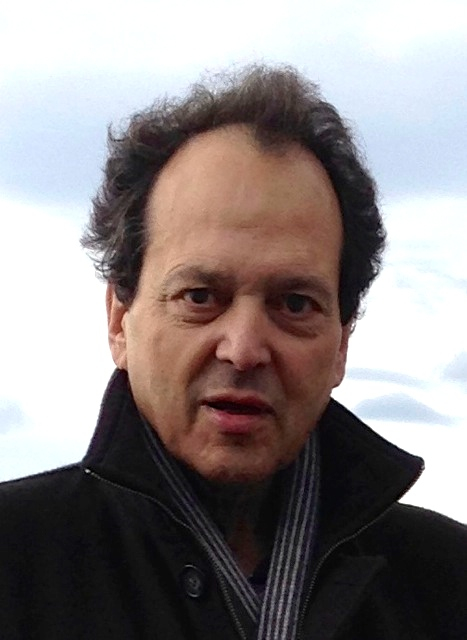
- Born: August 9, 1944; Washington, D.C., U.S.
- Died: April 30, 2018 (aged 73); Danville, Pennsylvania, U.S.
- Education: Moscow State University
- Known for: Ergodic theory and dynamical systems
- Scientific career
- Fields: Mathematics – dynamical systems
- Workplaces: Moscow State University; University of Maryland, College Park; California Institute of Technology; Pennsylvania State University
- Doctoral advisor: Yakov Sinai
- Doctoral students: Danijela Damjanović

Anatoly Borisovich Katok (Russian: Анатолий Борисович Каток; August 9, 1944 – April 30, 2018) was an American mathematician with Russian-Jewish origins. Katok was the director of the Center for Dynamics and Geometry at the Pennsylvania State University. His field of research was the theory of dynamical systems.

== Early life and education ==
Anatole Katok graduated from Moscow State University, from which he received his master's degree in 1965 and PhD in 1968 (with a thesis on "Applications of the Method of Approximation of Dynamical Systems by Periodic Transformations to Ergodic Theory" under Yakov Sinai). In 1978 he immigrated to the USA. He was married to the mathematician Svetlana Katok, who also works on dynamical systems and has been involved with Katok in the MASS Program for undergraduate students at Penn State.

== Work and research ==
While in graduate school, Katok (together with A. Stepin) developed a theory of periodic approximations of measure-preserving transformations commonly known as Katok—Stepin approximations. This theory helped to solve some problems that went back to von Neumann and Kolmogorov, and won the prize of the Moscow Mathematical Society in 1967.

His next result was the theory of monotone (or Kakutani) equivalence, which is based on a generalization of the concept of time-change in flows. There are constructions in the theory of dynamical systems that are due to Katok. Among these are the Anosov—Katok construction of smooth ergodic area-preserving diffeomorphisms of compact manifolds, the construction of Bernoulli diffeomorphisms with nonzero Lyapunov exponents on any surface, and the first construction of an invariant foliation for which Fubini's theorem fails in the worst possible way (Fubini foiled).

With Elon Lindenstrauss and Manfred Einsiedler, Katok made important progress on the Littlewood conjecture in the theory of Diophantine approximations.

Katok was also known for formulating conjectures and problems (for some of which he even offered prizes) that influenced bodies of work in dynamical systems. The best-known of these is the Katok Entropy Conjecture, which connects geometric and dynamical properties of geodesic flows. It is one of the first rigidity statements in dynamical systems. In the last two decades Katok has been working on other rigidity phenomena, and in collaboration with several colleagues, made contributions to smooth rigidity and geometric rigidity, to differential and cohomological rigidity of smooth actions of higher-rank abelian groups and of lattices in Lie groups of higher rank, to measure rigidity for group actions and to nonuniformly hyperbolic actions of higher-rank abelian groups.

Katok's works on topological properties of nonuniformly hyperbolic dynamical systems. It includes density of periodic points and lower bounds on their number as well as exhaustion of topological entropy by horseshoes. These were the topic of his lecture at the International Congress of Mathematicians in 1983, as well as the 1982 Rufus Bowen Memorial Lectures at University of California, Berkeley.

Katok's collaboration with his former student Boris Hasselblatt resulted in the book Introduction to the Modern Theory of Dynamical Systems, published by Cambridge University Press in 1995. This book is considered as encyclopedia of modern dynamical systems and is among the most cited publications in the area.

Anatole Katok was editor-in-chief of the Journal of Modern Dynamics and a member of the editorial boards of multiple other prestigious publications, including Ergodic Theory and Dynamical Systems, Cambridge Tracts in Mathematics, and Cambridge Studies in Advanced Mathematics.

== Teaching ==
Katok held tenured faculty positions at three mathematics departments: University of Maryland (1978–1984), California Institute of Technology (1984–1990) and since 1990 at the Pennsylvania State University, where he held the Raymond N. Shibley professorship since 1996. He had advised 44 PhD students on their thesis; the Mathematics Genealogy Project lists most of his PhD students, and 121 descendants.

== Honors and recognition ==
In 1967 Katok was awarded a Moscow Mathematical Society for Young Mathematicians Prize (with A. Stepin and V. Oseledets). In 1983 he was an invited speaker at the International Congress of Mathematicians in Warsaw (his talk was titled "Nonuniform hyperbolicity and structure of smooth dynamical systems"). Katok became a member of American Academy of Arts and Sciences in 2004. In 2012, he became a fellow of the American Mathematical Society.

== Selected monographs ==
- Anatole Katok and Boris Hasselblatt, Introduction to the Modern Theory of Dynamical Systems, Encyclopedia of Mathematics and Its Applications 54 Cambridge University Press, 1995, ISBN 0-521-34187-6
- Boris Hasselblatt and Anatole Katok, A First Course in Dynamics with a Panorama of Recent Developments Cambridge University Press, 2003, ISBN 0521587506.
- Anatole Katok, Combinatorial Constructions in Ergodic Theory and Dynamics Pennsylvania State University, University Park, Pennsylvania, University Lecture Series, 2003, ISBN 978-0-8218-3496-1.
- Anatole Katok and Boris Hasselblatt (eds.) Handbook of Dynamical Systems Vol 1A, Elsevier 2002, ISBN 0-444-82669-6.
- Anatole Katok and Boris Hasselblatt (eds.) Handbook of Dynamical Systems, Vol 1B, Elsevier 2005, ISBN 0-444-52055-4.
- Anatole Katok and Vaughn Climenhaga, Lectures on Surfaces: (Almost) Everything You Wanted to Know about Them, Pennsylvania State University – AMS, 2008, ISBN 978-0-8218-4679-7.
- Anatole Katok and Viorel Nitica, Rigidity in Higher Rank Abelian Group Actions: Volume 1, Cambridge University Press, June 2011, ISBN 9780521879095.
