= Giovanni Forni =

Italian mathematician

- Education: University of Bologna; Princeton University
- Awards: Michael Brin Prize in Dynamical Systems
- Scientific career
- Fields: Mathematics
- Workplaces: University of Maryland
- Doctoral advisor: John Mather

Giovanni Forni is an Italian mathematician at the University of Maryland known for his research in dynamical systems.

After graduating from the University of Bologna in 1989, he obtained his PhD in 1993 from Princeton University, under the supervision of John Mather.

He was an invited speaker at the 2002 International Congress of Mathematicians in Beijing.

For his work on solutions of cohomological equations for flows on surfaces, and on the Kontsevich–Zorich conjecture concerning deviation of ergodic averages, he was awarded the 2008 Michael Brin Prize in Dynamical Systems.

In 2012, he became a fellow of the American Mathematical Society.
