= Institute of Mathematics of the Polish Academy of Sciences =

Research institute of the Polish Academy of Sciences

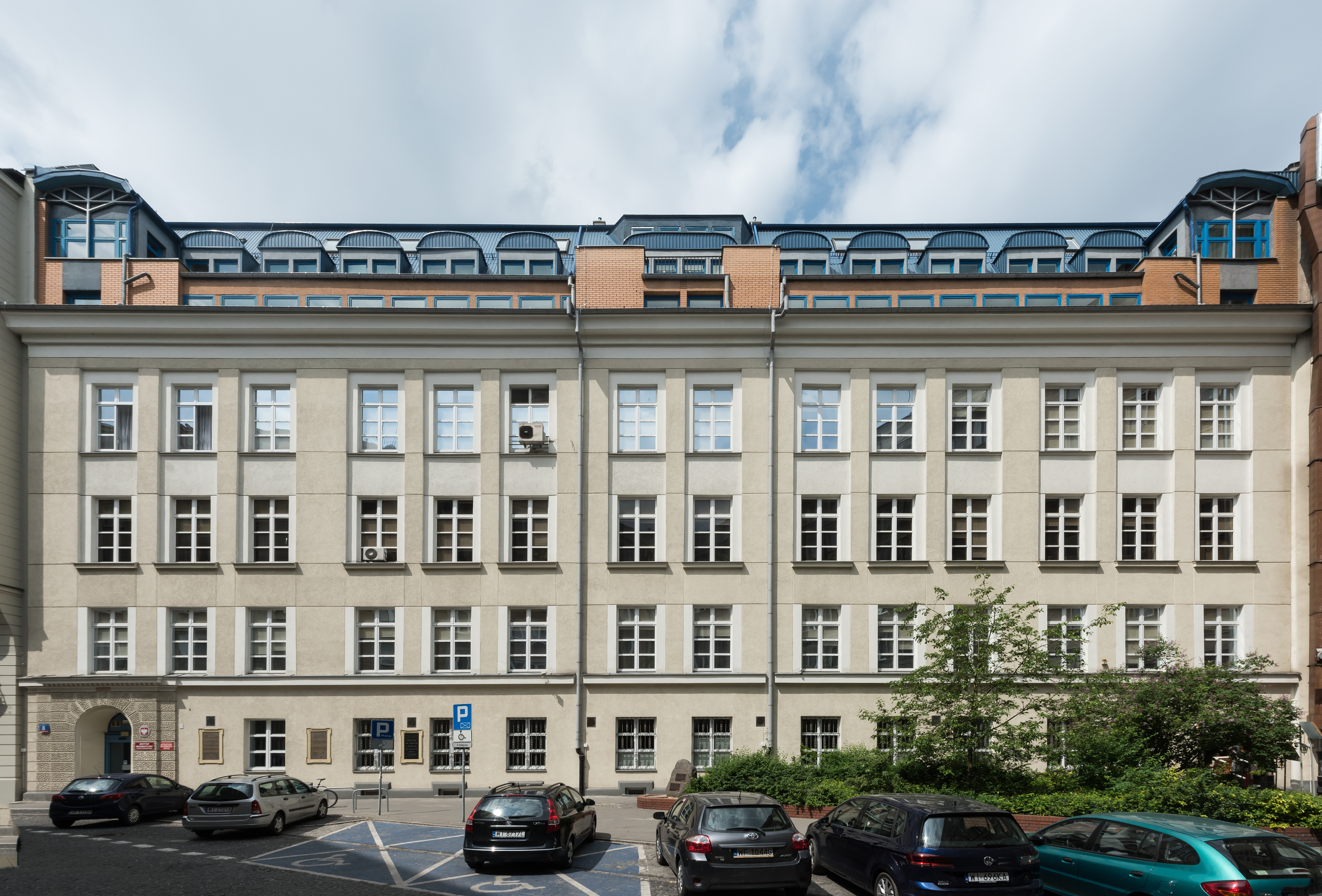
- The seat of the institute at 8 Śniadecki Street
- Type: research institute
- Established: November 20, 1948
- Parent institution: Polish Academy of Sciences
- Director: Prof. Zbigniew Błocki
- Location: ul. Śniadeckich 8; 00-656 Warsaw, Poland; 52°13′17.6″N 21°00′53.4″E
- Website: http://www.impan.pl

The Institute of Mathematics of the Polish Academy of Sciences (Polish: Instytut Matematyczny Polskiej Akademii Nauk) is a research institute of the Polish Academy of Sciences (PAN) headquartered in Warsaw at 8 Śniadeckich Street.

== History ==
It was established on November 20, 1948 as the National Mathematical Institute and in the same year the Mathematical Devices Group (Polish: Grupa Aparatów Matematycznych) was established there, and this can be considered the beginning of computer science in Poland. According to a 1945 project by Karol Borsuk, Bronisław Knaster and Kazimierz Kuratowski, the institute is subdivided into sections corresponding to the major branches of mathematics. In 1952, it was incorporated into the structures of the Polish Academy of Sciences. The institute conducts doctoral studies in the field of mathematics and is located at 8 Śniadeckich Street in the Śródmieście District of Warsaw.

Over the course of its history, a number of prominent Polish mathematicians were employed by the institute including Stanisław Gołąb, Kazimierz Kuratowski, Franciszek Leja, Edward Marczewski, Stanisław Mazur, Andrzej Mostowski, Władysław Orlicz, Witold Pogorzelski, Wacław Sierpiński, Hugo Steinhaus and Tadeusz Ważewski.

In 1972, the institute saw the establishment of the International Stefan Banach Center. It hosts workshops and conferences with participation of both young mathematicians and specialists from different countries around the world.

== Structure ==
The structure of the Institute of Mathematics of the Polish Academy of Sciences (IMPAS).

- Headquarters in Warsaw: 8 Śniadeckich Street, 00-656 Warsaw
- Gdańsk Branch: 18 Abrahama Street, 81-825 Sopot

head – Prof. Tomasz Szarek

- Katowice Branch: 14 Bankowa Street, 40-007 Katowice

head – Prof. Ryszard Rudnicki

- Kraków Branch: 30 Świętego Tomasza Street, 31-027 Kraków

head – Dr hab. Michał Kapustka (IMPAN Prof.)

- Poznań Branch: 87 Umultowska Street, 61-614 Poznań

Activities suspended

- Toruń Branch: 12 F. Chopina Street, 87-100 Toruń

head – Prof. Yuriy Tomilov

- Wrocław Branch: 18 Kopernika Street, 51-617 Wrocław

head – dr hab. Adam Nowak

Other IMPAN units:

- Stefan Banach International Mathematical Center
- Będlewo Conference Centre, near Poznań
- Research Centres:
- Dioscuri Centre for Topological Data Analysis
- Centre for Applications of Mathematics
- Central Mathematical Library – its collections include more than 80,000 volumes of books and over 85,000 volumes of journals. The Library provides readers with access to more than 5,000 electronic mathematics books and approximately 12,000 scientific electronic journals.

== Awards ==
The Institute presents the following awards:

- The Stefan Banach Medal
- Institute of Mathematics of the Polish Academy of Sciences Prize for outstanding scientific achievements in mathematics
- Kazimierz Kuratowski Prize
- The Director of IM PAN Award for Distinguished Doctoral Theses (formerly the Marek Wacławek Foundation Awards)
- Barbara and Jaroslav Zemánek prize

== Directors of the Institute ==
- Kazimierz Kuratowski (1948–1967)
- Roman Sikorski (1967–1969)
- Jerzy Maria Łoś (1970)
- Czesław Olech (1970–1985)
- Bogdan Bojarski (1985–2002)
- Stanisław Janeczko (2002–2010)
- Feliks Przytycki (2010–2018)
- Łukasz Stettner (2018–2022)
- Karol Palka (2022–2026)
- Zbigniew Błocki (2026–present)

== Chairpersons of the Scientific Council ==
- Wacław Sierpiński (1952–1967)
- Kazimierz Kuratowski (1968–1980)
- Karol Borsuk (1980–1982)
- Zbigniew Ciesielski (1980–1989)
- Czesław Olech (1989–2007)
- Andrzej Schinzel (2007–2018)
- Feliks Przytycki (2019–present)

== Researchers ==
- Stanisław Hartman
