= Fermi–Dirac =

Fermi–Dirac may refer to:

- Fermi–Dirac statistics or Fermi–Dirac distribution
- Fermi–Dirac integral (disambiguation)
  - Complete Fermi–Dirac integral
  - Incomplete Fermi–Dirac integral

== See also ==
- Fermi (disambiguation)
- Dirac (disambiguation)
