= List of things named after Paul Dirac =

Below is a list of things, primarily in the fields of mathematics and physics, named in honour of Paul Adrien Maurice Dirac.

== Physics ==
- Dirac large numbers hypothesis
- Dirac monopole
- Dirac string
- Dirac's string trick
- Dirac–Born–Infeld action
- Dirac path integral
- Dirac coordinates

=== Quantum physics ===
==== Notations ====
- Dirac notation
- Dirac bracket

==== Equations and related objects ====
- Dirac adjoint
- Dirac cone
  - Dirac points
- Dirac constant, see reduced Planck constant
- Dirac–Coulomb–Breit Hamiltonian
- Dirac equation
  - Dirac equation in curved spacetime
  - Dirac equation in the algebra of physical space
  - Nonlinear Dirac equation
  - Two-body Dirac equations
- Dirac fermion
- Dirac field
- Dirac gauge
- Dirac hole theory
- Dirac Lagrangian
- Dirac matrices
- Dirac matter
- Dirac membrane
- Dirac picture
- Dirac sea
- Dirac spectrum
- Dirac spinor

=== Formalisms ===
- Fermi–Dirac statistics
- Dirac–von Neumann axioms

=== Effects ===
- Abraham–Lorentz–Dirac force
- Kapitsa–Dirac effect

== Pure and applied mathematics ==
- Complete Fermi–Dirac integral
  - Incomplete Fermi–Dirac integral
- Dirac delta function
  - Dirac comb
  - Dirac measure
- Dirac operator
- Dirac algebra

== Other uses ==
- 5997 Dirac, an asteroid
- The various Dirac Medals
- Dirac (software)
- DiRAC supercomputing research facility of the Science and Technology Facilities Council
- Dirac Science Library, at Florida State University
- Dirac road, Bristol, (51.477897°N 2.578496°W).
