= List of mathematical functions =

In mathematics, some functions or groups of functions are important enough to deserve their own names. This is a listing of articles which explain some of these functions in more detail. There is a large theory of special functions which developed out of statistics and mathematical physics. A modern, abstract point of view contrasts large function spaces, which are infinite-dimensional and within which most functions are "anonymous", with special functions picked out by properties such as symmetry, or relationship to harmonic analysis and group representations.

See also List of types of functions

== Elementary functions ==
Elementary functions are functions built from basic operations (e.g. addition, exponentials, logarithms...)

=== Algebraic functions ===
Algebraic functions are functions that can be expressed as the solution of a polynomial equation with integer (or equivalently rational) coefficients.

- Polynomials: Can be generated solely by addition, multiplication, and raising to the power of a positive integer.
  - Constant function: polynomial of degree zero, graph is a horizontal straight line
  - Linear function: First degree polynomial, graph is a straight line.
  - Quadratic function: Second degree polynomial, graph is a parabola.
  - Cubic function: Third degree polynomial.
  - Quartic function: Fourth degree polynomial.
  - Quintic function: Fifth degree polynomial.
- Rational functions: A ratio of two polynomials.
- nth root
  - Square root: Yields a number whose square is the given one.
  - Cube root: Yields a number whose cube is the given one.

=== Elementary transcendental functions ===
Transcendental functions are functions that are not algebraic.

- Exponential function: raises a fixed number to a variable power.
- Hyperbolic functions: formally similar to the trigonometric functions.
  - Inverse hyperbolic functions: inverses of the hyperbolic functions, analogous to the inverse circular functions.
- Logarithms: the inverses of exponential functions; useful to solve equations involving exponentials.
  - Natural logarithm
  - Common logarithm
  - Binary logarithm
- Periodic functions
  - Trigonometric functions: sine, cosine, tangent, cotangent, secant, cosecant, exsecant, excosecant, versine, coversine, vercosine, covercosine, haversine, hacoversine, havercosine, hacovercosine; used in geometry and to describe periodic phenomena.
    - Inverse trigonometric functions.
    - See also Gudermannian function.

Most special functions are transcendental.

== Special functions ==
=== Piecewise special functions ===
- Indicator function: maps x to either 1 or 0, depending on whether or not x belongs to some subset.
- Step function: A finite linear combination of indicator functions of half-open intervals.
  - Heaviside step function: 0 for negative arguments and 1 for positive arguments. The integral of the Dirac delta function.
- Sawtooth wave
- Square wave
- Triangle wave
- Rectangular function
- Floor function: Largest integer less than or equal to a given number.
- Ceiling function: Smallest integer larger than or equal to a given number.
- Sign function: Returns only the sign of a number, as +1, −1 or 0.
- Absolute value: distance to the origin (zero point)

=== Arithmetic functions ===
- Sigma function: Sums of powers of divisors of a given natural number.
- Euler's totient function: Number of numbers coprime to (and not bigger than) a given one.
- Prime-counting function: Number of primes less than or equal to a given number.
- Partition function: Order-independent count of ways to write a given positive integer as a sum of positive integers.
- Möbius μ function: Sum of the nth primitive roots of unity, it depends on the prime factorization of n.
- Prime omega functions
- Chebyshev functions
- Liouville function: $\Lambda(n)=(-1)^{\Omega(n)}$
- Von Mangoldt function, Λ(n) = log p if n is a positive power of the prime p
- Carmichael function: $\lambda(n)=$ The smallest integer $m$ such that $a^m\equiv 1\pmod{n}$ for all $a$ coprime to $n$
- Radical function: The product of the distinct prime factors of a positive integer input.

=== Antiderivatives of elementary functions ===
- Logarithmic integral function: Integral of the reciprocal of the logarithm, important in the prime number theorem.
- Exponential integral
- Trigonometric integral: Including Sine Integral and Cosine Integral
- Inverse tangent integral
- Error function: An integral important for normal random variables.
  - Fresnel integral: related to the error function; used in optics.
  - Dawson function: occurs in probability.
  - Faddeeva function

=== Gamma and related functions ===
- Gamma function: A generalization of the factorial function.
- Barnes G-function
- Beta function: Corresponding binomial coefficient analogue.
- Digamma function, Polygamma function
- Incomplete beta function
- Incomplete gamma function
- K-function
- Multivariate gamma function: A generalization of the Gamma function useful in multivariate statistics.
- Student's t-distribution
- Pi function $\Pi(z) = z \Gamma(z) = (z)!$

=== Elliptic and related functions ===
- Elliptic integrals: Arising from the path length of ellipses; important in many applications. Alternate notations include:
  - Carlson symmetric form
  - Legendre form
- Nome
- Quarter period
- Elliptic functions: The inverses of elliptic integrals; used to model double-periodic phenomena.
  - Jacobi's elliptic functions
  - Weierstrass's elliptic functions
  - Lemniscate elliptic functions
- Theta functions
- Neville theta functions
- Modular lambda function
- Closely related are the modular forms, which include
  - J-invariant
  - Dedekind eta function

=== Bessel and related functions ===
- Airy function
- Bessel functions: Defined by a differential equation; useful in astronomy, electromagnetism, and mechanics.
- Bessel–Clifford function
- Kelvin functions
- Legendre function: From the theory of spherical harmonics.
- Scorer's function
- Sinc function
- Hermite polynomials
- Laguerre polynomials
- Chebyshev polynomials
- Synchrotron function

=== Riemann zeta and related functions ===
- Riemann zeta function: A special case of Dirichlet series.
- Riemann Xi function
- Dirichlet eta function: An allied function.
- Dirichlet beta function
- Dirichlet L-function
- Hurwitz zeta function
- Legendre chi function
- Lerch transcendent
- Polylogarithm and related functions:
  - Incomplete polylogarithm
  - Clausen function
  - Complete Fermi–Dirac integral, an alternate form of the polylogarithm.
  - Dilogarithm
  - Incomplete Fermi–Dirac integral
  - Kummer's function
- Riesz function

=== Hypergeometric and related functions ===
- Hypergeometric functions: Versatile family of power series.
- Confluent hypergeometric function
- Associated Legendre functions
- Meijer G-function
- Fox H-function

=== Iterated exponential and related functions ===
- Hyperoperations
- Iterated logarithm
- Super-logarithms
- Tetration

=== Other standard special functions ===
- Lambert W function: Inverse of f(w) = w exp(w).
- Lamé function
- Mathieu function
- Mittag-Leffler function
- Painlevé transcendents
- Parabolic cylinder function
- Arithmetic–geometric mean

=== Miscellaneous functions ===
- Ackermann function: in the theory of computation, a computable function that is not primitive recursive.
- Dirac delta function: everywhere zero except for x = 0; total integral is 1. Not a function but a distribution, but sometimes informally referred to as a function, particularly by physicists and engineers.
- Dirichlet function: is an indicator function that matches 1 to rational numbers and 0 to irrationals. It is nowhere continuous.
- Thomae's function: is a function that is continuous at all irrational numbers and discontinuous at all rational numbers. It is also a modification of Dirichlet function and sometimes called Riemann function.
- Kronecker delta function: is a function of two variables, usually integers, which is 1 if they are equal, and 0 otherwise.
- Minkowski's question mark function: Derivatives vanish on the rationals.
- Weierstrass function: is an example of continuous function that is nowhere differentiable

== See also ==
- List of types of functions
- Test functions for optimization
- List of mathematical abbreviations
- List of special functions and eponyms
