= Positronium negative ion =

Atom of two electrons and one positron

- Cartoon representation of the positronium negative ion

Identifiers
ChEBI	CHEBI:46710

Related compounds
Related compounds	Positronium hydride; Dipositronium
- Except where otherwise noted, data are given for materials in their standard state (at 25 °C [77 °F], 100 kPa). Infobox references

The positronium negative ion ($\text{Ps}^-$) is an exotic atom composed of three elementary particles: two electrons ($e^-$) and one positron ($e^+$). It is an unstable system due to electron-positron annihilation, with a lifetime of 479 ps.

Observed for the first time in 1981, it is the simplest three-body system containing both matter and antimatter and composed exclusively of leptons, serving as a reference system for studying the quantum mechanical three-body problem. Additionally, the production of this ion is the initial step toward generating energy-tunable positronium beams for fundamental physics research.

== History ==
The existence of a bound state between two electrons and a positron was first theoretically predicted by John Archibald Wheeler in 1946. In his work Polyelectrons, he theorized the existence of exotic bound systems, including the di-positronium, observed for the first time in 2007, and the positronium positive ion.

Since then, numerous theoretical works on $\text{Ps}^-$ have been published, concerning its binding energy, lifetime and other characteristics. Nevertheless, given the low production efficiency and its short lifetime, the first experimental observation was achieved only in 1981 by Allen P. Mills.

In 2007 a new experimental technique achieved the first production of this ion with increased conversion efficiencies (up to 1.5%). This approach to generate $\text{Ps}^-$ provided a positron-to-$\text{Ps}^-$ conversion efficiency significantly higher compared to the method used by Mills (less than 0.1%).

== Energy levels and annihilation ==
Simplified scheme of the positronium negative ion spin configuration and distances, inspired by other works.

The internal structure of $\text{Ps}^-$ presents characteristics similar to an electron weakly bound to a positronium (Ps) atom. The expectation values for the positron-electron and electron-electron distances have been computed, obtaining 2.90 Å ($e^+$-$e^-$ distance) and 4.52 Å ($e^-$-$e^-$ distance).

As a three-body quantum system, the Schrödinger equation for $\text{Ps}^-$ cannot be solved analytically, and some approximation methods must be applied. Furthermore, the Born–Oppenheimer approximation cannot be applied, since the three bodies possess exactly the same mass. Therefore, theoretical determinations of the ground state energy have been performed through precision numerical computation, yielding a value of $E_\mathrm{g} = -7.13\,\text{eV}$. The negative sign indicates that $\text{Ps}^-$ is stable against dissociation into its constituent particles. Nevertheless, it is an unstable system against annihilation. This occurs, from a quantum mechanical point of view, when the wave functions of an electron and of the positron partially overlap in space. The positron can possess up or down spin orientation, without restrictions. Nevertheless, the two electrons must be in a singlet state, due to the Pauli exclusion principle. As a consequence, the annihilation process may occur either with an electron that possesses the same spin orientation of the positron or with an electron with opposite spin. These two cases present different properties due to the distinct selection rules for the processes. In the first case, an odd number of gamma rays is generated (predominantly three), as it happens for ortho-positronium. In the second case, an even number of gamma rays is generated (most probably two), as in the case of para-positronium. Taking the spin-average between the theoretical decay rates of ortho-Ps and para-Ps results in:

$$\Gamma = \frac{3}{4}\cdot\Gamma_{\text{ortho-Ps}}+\frac{1}{4}\cdot\Gamma_{\text{para-Ps}} \approx 2.0871\,\text{ns}^{-1}$$

The decay rate for $\text{Ps}^-$has been theoretically computed to be $\Gamma_{\text{th}} = 2.087963(12)\,\text{ns}^{-1}$, and experimentally measured at $\Gamma_{\text{ex}} = 2.0875(50)\,\text{ns}^{-1}$. This experimental value is consistent with the theoretical prediction and corresponds to a lifetime $\tau \approx 479\,\text{ps}$. This rate accounts for the sum of several possible decay channels, although the dominant contribution is given by the two-gamma decay.

== Production ==
High-efficiency production of positronium negative ions.

The first experimental generations of $\text{Ps}^-$ employed the beam-foil method. This consists in a positron beam impinging on a thin carbon foil target. The positrons' energy is adjusted such that a fraction of them penetrates the whole target. These positrons may exit from the other side of the target and bound two electrons with a certain probability, giving rise to $\text{Ps}^-$.

More recently, an alternative way of producing $\text{Ps}^-$ was developed by the group of Yasuyuki Nagashima. This method is based on increasing the electronic cloud density close to the surface of a metal from which positrons are emitted. To achieve this, an established procedure is to cover the surface of a metallic sample with a sub-monolayer of an alkali metal. Upon this coverage procedure, the electron work function of the system is reduced. The spontaneous emission of $\text{Ps}^-$ from a surface is governed by the quantity
$$\phi_{\text{Ps}^-} = \phi_+ + 2\phi_- - 7.13\,\text{eV}$$

where $\phi_+$ and $\phi_-$ are the positron and electron work functions respectively. If $\phi_{\text{Ps}^-}$, called $\text{Ps}^-$ affinity, is negative, then the emission of $\text{Ps}^-$ occurs spontaneously. Therefore, given the strong dependence on the electron work function, reducing the latter increases the $\text{Ps}^-$ production efficiency. Positrons that penetrate the sample undergo several inelastic scattering events, losing kinetic energy. A large majority of them annihilate with the conduction electrons of the metal or thermalize and subsequently annihilate. However, a fraction thermalizes inside the sample and diffuses. In some cases, the diffusion is directed toward the target surface and $\text{Ps}^-$ may be formed, with the positron binding two electrons, and emitted under the previously described conditions.

The target is usually made of tungsten, due to its negative value for the $\text{Ps}^-$ affinity. Indeed, the emission of $\text{Ps}^-$ from clean tungsten surfaces has been observed. Different alkali metals have been used for the sub-monolayer growth and to date sodium has provided the highest efficiency and duration. Indeed, the capping layer undergoes degradation over time, leading to a reduction in the ion emission efficiency. Sodium deposition is performed in situ, following a short annealing of the tungsten target. This heating is necessary to clean the target surface to ensure a pure and uniform sodium deposition. This production protocol achieves conversion efficiencies of positrons into $\text{Ps}^-$ up to 1.5%.

== Experimental research ==
The increased availability of $\text{Ps}^-$ in laboratories enabled broader experimental research involving this ion. There are two main research fields concerning this ion: one devoted to its fundamental properties and the other focused on the production of energy-tunable neutral positronium beams.

=== Production of positronium beams ===
Schematic diagram of the production of a positronium beam via $\text{Ps}^-$ emission.

The production of $\text{Ps}^-$ represents the initial stage toward the generation of positronium beams. The direct production of neutral positronium beams is constrained by its zero net electric charge, which prevents the use of standard electromagnetic optics to achieve efficient acceleration and focusing. Consequently, current experimental setups bypass this limitation by first producing a $\text{Ps}^-$ beam, employing the high-efficiency generation method described above. The subsequent step consists in removing one electron via photo-detachment. This method involves the use of a high-power laser cavity. The $\text{Ps}^-$ beam crosses the laser beam, which provides sufficient energy to remove one electron via single-photon absorption. The photo-detachment has been performed using a 1064 nm wavelength laser. To maximize the photo-detachment probability a high photon flux is required. For this reason, a pulsed regime was used, allowing for a higher light intensity compared to the continuous-wave operation. Nevertheless, Monte Carlo simulations have been performed, indicating that achieving photo-detachment in continuous wave mode is feasible.

Positronium beams can be used for several purposes. These include experimental tests of the CPT symmetry and of the Einstein Equivalence Principle (EEP) through positronium interferometry, as well as the study of antimatter gravity.

=== QED investigation and three-body problem ===
The positronium negative ion is the lightest known system composed of three elementary particles. It contains both matter and antimatter and it is composed exclusively of leptons. Therefore, its constituents, as well as the whole system, do not possess any color charge and do not interact through the strong interaction. Unlike atomic systems, such as the hydrogen negative ion ($\ce{H^-}$), $\text{Ps}^-$ is free from uncertainties related to the presence of hadrons. These features make the positronium negative ion a system for the study of Quantum Electrodynamics (QED), allowing for precise comparisons between theoretical predictions and experimental measurements.

Given the absence of a central massive nucleus, $\text{Ps}^-$ represents a benchmark for the three-body problem. Computational techniques, such as the use of Rayleigh-Ritz variational method and of Hylleraas-type wave functions, must be applied to precisely calculate the ground state energy, including its relativistic and QED energy shifts.

== See also ==
- Annihilation
- Antimatter
- Di-positronium
- Positron
- Positronium
- Standard Model
- Three-body problem
