= Henry Way Kendall =

American particle physicist who won the Nobel Prize in Physics

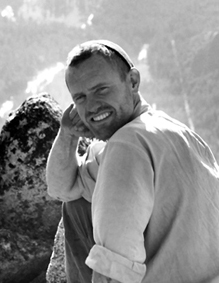
- Henry Kendall climbing in Yosemite Valley. Photo by Tom Frost.
- Born: December 9, 1926; Boston, Massachusetts, U.S.
- Died: February 15, 1999 (aged 72); Wakulla Springs State Park, Florida, U.S.
- Education: Amherst College (BA); Massachusetts Institute of Technology (PhD)
- Awards: Nobel Prize in Physics (1990)
- Scientific career
- Fields: Particle physics
- Workplaces: MIT; Stanford University
- Doctoral advisor: Martin Deutsch

Henry Way Kendall (December 9, 1926 – February 15, 1999) was an American particle physicist who won the Nobel Prize in Physics in 1990 jointly with Jerome Isaac Friedman and Richard E. Taylor "for their pioneering investigations concerning deep inelastic scattering of electrons on protons and bound neutrons, which have been of essential importance for the development of the quark model in particle physics."

== Biography ==
Kendall was born in Boston to Evelyn Way and Henry P. Kendall, an industrialist. Kendall grew up in Sharon, Massachusetts and attended Deerfield Academy. He enrolled in the U.S. Merchant Marine Academy in 1945, and served on a troop transport on the North Atlantic in the winter of 1945 – 1946.

In 1946, he enrolled at Amherst College where he majored in mathematics, graduating in 1950. While at Amherst, he operated a diving and marine salvage company during two summers. He co-authored two books, one on shallow water diving and the other on underwater photography.

He did graduate research at the Massachusetts Institute of Technology, involving an experimental study of positronium, and he obtained his PhD in 1955. He then spent the next two years as a postdoctoral fellow at Brookhaven National Laboratory. He then spent five years in Robert Hofstadter's research group at Stanford University in the late 1950s and early 1960s, where he worked with Jerome Friedman and Richard Taylor, studying the structure of protons and neutrons, using the university's 300 feet long linear electron accelerator. He developed a close working relationship with Wolfgang K. H. Panofsky at Stanford.

Kendall joined the faculty of the MIT Physics Department in 1961, where he remained until his death in 1999. He was named Julius A. Stratton Professor of Physics in 1991.

In the late 1960s and early 1970s, Kendall worked in collaboration with researchers at the Stanford Linear Accelerator Center (SLAC) including Friedman and Taylor. These experiments involved scattering high-energy beams of electrons from protons and deuterons and heavier nuclei. At lower energies, it had already been found that the electrons would only be scattered through low angles, consistent with the idea that the nucleons had no internal structure. However, the SLAC-MIT experiments showed that higher energy electrons could be scattered through much higher angles, with the loss of some energy. These deep inelastic scattering results provided the first experimental evidence that the protons and neutrons were made up of point-like particles, later identified to be the up and down quarks that had previously been proposed on theoretical grounds. The experiments also provided the first evidence for the existence of gluons.

Kendall was not only a very accomplished physicist, but also a very skilled mountaineer and photographer. He did extensive rock climbing in Yosemite Valley, followed by expeditions to the Andes, Himalaya and Antarctica, photographing his experiences with large format cameras. He was elected a Fellow of the American Academy of Arts and Sciences in 1982. On April 7, 2012, the American Alpine Club inducted Kendall into its Hall of Mountaineering Excellence at an award ceremony in Golden, Colorado.

== Service activities ==
Kendall was one of the founding members of the Union of Concerned Scientists (UCS) in 1969. He served as chairman of the board of the UCS from 1974 until his death in 1999. His public policy interests included avoiding nuclear war, the Strategic Defense Initiative, the B2 bomber, nuclear reactor safety and global warming.

He was also a member of the JASON Defense Advisory Group.

== Death ==
Kendall died while diving the cave at the Edward Ball Wakulla Springs State Park, Florida as a part of the Wakulla 2 Project. He bypassed two pre-dive checklists for his Cis-Lunar MK-5P Mixed Gas rebreather and entered the spring basin without his dive buddy from the National Geographic Society. Kendall missed turning on the oxygen supply to his rebreather and lost consciousness and drowned. The autopsy revealed a physiological issue that led to his disregarding the protocols.

== Awards and honors ==
- Fellow of the American Academy of Arts and Sciences, 1982
- Bertrand Russell Society Award, 1982
- Nobel Prize in Physics, 1990
- Golden Plate Award of the American Academy of Achievement, 1993
- Hall of Mountaineering Excellence of the American Alpine Club, 2012
