= Stjepan Mohorovičić =

Croatian physicist, geophysicist, and meteorologist (1890–1980)

- Portrait of Stjepan Mohorovičić
- Born: 20 August 1890; Bakar, Kingdom of Croatia-Slavonia, Austria-Hungary (present-day Croatia)
- Died: 13 February 1980 (aged 89); Zagreb, SR Croatia, SFR Yugoslavia
- Citizenship: Hungarian-Croatian (1890–1918); Croatian (1918–1945); Yugoslavian (1945–1980)
- Education: University of Zagreb
- Known for: Discovering Positronium
- Scientific career
- Fields: Physics, Geophysics, Meteorology

Stjepan Mohorovičić (August 20, 1890 – February 13, 1980) was a Croatian physicist, geophysicist and meteorologist, known as the "father of positronium", whose existence he predicted in 1934.

== Biography ==
Mohorovičić was born in the town of Bakar. His father was the world-famous geophysicist Andrija Mohorovičić. He studied mathematics and physics at the University of Zagreb where among others his professors were Vinko Dvořák and Andrija Mohorovičić, and later he studied at Göttingen where some of his professors were Arnold Sommerfeld, Woldemar Voigt and David Hilbert. Later on he received a doctorate degree from the University of Zagreb. Mohorovičić was an opponent of Einstein's theory of relativity. Because of his longtime opposition and criticisms of theory of relativity he remained a high school professor his whole life. His work went largely ignored, especially in Croatia. He died in Zagreb.

== Scientific work ==
His scientific interests included seismology, meteorology, astrophysics and theoretical physics. He began his career in seismology with his father. In 1913 he developed a new method for locating the hypocenter of an earthquake and gave an independent verification of discontinuity theory put forward by his father. In 1916 he published an idea of the existence of smaller discontinuities in Earth's crust and mantle. He put forward his own theory about the composition and the formation of the Moon, explosive formation of lunar craters and predicted the existence of Moho layer on the Moon. The existence of Moho layer on the Moon was confirmed in 1969 by seismic measurements done by Apollo 11 crew.

His most significant work being the 1934 prediction of the existence of positronium, Mohorovičić is often called "the father of positronium". The electron-positron atom was experimentally discovered only in 1951 by Martin Deutsch. Positronium is the bound state of an electron and a positron and therefore the lightest atom. At the time, Mohorovičić did not identify the positron with Dirac's antielectron. In his paper, Mohorovičić also calculated spectra of positronium and predicted the existence of positronium in stars because of which he suggested the identification of possible spectral lines of positronium in spectra of stars. He searched for spectra of positronium in the sky, but unsuccessfully. Positronium lines were first identified in lab in 1975 by Canter et al. and in outer space in spectra of Crab Nebula in 1984 by J. E. McClintock.

== See also ==
- Rindler coordinates
