= Dirac (disambiguation) =

Paul Dirac (1902–1984) was a Swiss-British theoretical physicist, Nobel laureate, and a founder of the field of quantum physics.

Dirac may also refer to:

- DiRAC, Distributed Research using Advanced Computing, a supercomputing facility
- Dirac (software), a relativistic quantum chemistry program
- Dirac, Charente, a commune in the Charente département of France
- 5997 Dirac, a main-belt asteroid
- Gabriel Andrew Dirac (1925–1984), graph theorist, Paul Dirac's stepson
- Dirac (dress), a Somali dress
- Dirac (video compression format), an open digital video codec developed by BBC Research
- Dirac (information flow), a humorous unit of measurement devised by Paul Dirac's colleagues, equivalent to one word per hour

== See also ==
- Dirac Medal (disambiguation)
- Dirak, former name of the town of Karnut, Armenia
