= Fermi–Dirac integral =

Fermi–Dirac integral may refer to:

- Complete Fermi–Dirac integral
- Incomplete Fermi–Dirac integral
