= Fermi (disambiguation) =

Enrico Fermi (1901–1954) was an Italian physicist who created the world's first nuclear reactor.

Fermi or Enrico Fermi may also refer to:

== Science and technology ==
- Fermi (crater), a lunar impact crater
- Fermi (microarchitecture), a microarchitecture developed by Nvidia
- Fermi (supercomputer), located at CINECA, Italy
- Fermi (unit), a unit of length in nuclear physics equivalent to the femtometre
- RA-1 Enrico Fermi, a research reactor in Argentina
- Fermi Explorer, a proposed interstellar probe
- Fermi Gamma-ray Space Telescope, a space observatory
- Fermi Linux, distributions produced by Fermilab
- FERMI, a free-electron laser at the ELETTRA research centre

== Other uses ==
- Enrico Fermi Institute, Chicago, Illinois, US
- Fermi (Turin Metro), a rapid transit station in Italy
- Laura Fermi (1907–1977), Enrico Fermi's wife

== See also ==
- Enrico Fermi Award
- Fermi–Dirac (disambiguation)
- Fermi Paradox (disambiguation)
- Fermi–Pasta–Ulam–Tsingou problem
- Fermi problem
- Fermi–Walker differentiation
- Fermi–Walker transport
- FERMIAC, an analog computer invented by Enrico Fermi
- Fermilab, Fermi National Accelerator Laboratory
- Fermion, a subatomic particle
- Fermionic field, in quantum field theory
- Fermium, an element on the periodic table
- List of things named after Enrico Fermi
