= Horseshoe-Shaped Hearth with Ram-Headed Ends =

- Material: clay
- Created: 3000 BC
- Discovered: Shirak, Karnut
- Present location: History Museum of Armenia
- Identification: 2995-2

The Horseshoe-Shaped Hearth with Ram-Headed Ends, is a clay sculpture found in the History Museum of Armenia.

Armenia's Early Bronze Age monuments that were discovered had similar hearths decorated with anthropomorphic and animal sculptures, that were special altars installed in homes to perform beliefs concerning agricultural rituals.

== History ==
Early Bronze Age culture built stone hearths next to clay mobile hearths which served different purposes. Horseshoe-shaped or arched-shaped mobile hearths are used only for ceremonial purposes. According to common belief, the mobile hearth symbolizes the male head of the household and their ability to prosper. The mobile hearths are put over extinguished fires or on top of ashes, then are kept on the inside of ancient ovens called tonirs, in a vertical position. There are examples of the Early Bronze Age found on a few stones assembled on fireplaces. (Note: 3000 BC monuments are not only found with strong ram heads, bodies, and limbs for worship in hearth fireplace horeshoe crutches, but also with ram-head medal accessories.)

== See also ==
- Hasmik Israelyan, Worship and Beliefs of the Late Bronze Age in Armenia, Yerevan, 1973
- View from the Bronze Age, album-catalog, History Museum of Armenia, 2010
