= Andrei Derevianko =

Andrei Derevianko is a theoretical physicist and the Sara Louise Hartman Endowed Professor in Physics at the University of Nevada, Reno. His research concerns relativistic atomic structure, atomic parity violation, precision timekeeping, quantum-sensor searches for physics beyond the Standard Model, and thorium-229 nuclear clocks. He was elected a Fellow of the American Physical Society in 2008 and was named a 2023 Fellow of the American Association for the Advancement of Science.

== Education and career ==
Derevianko received an M.S. in physics and applied mathematics from the Moscow Institute of Physics and Technology in 1992 and a Ph.D. in physics from Auburn University in 1996. He then held postdoctoral research positions at the University of Notre Dame from 1996 to 1999 and at Harvard University's Institute for Theoretical Atomic, Molecular and Optical Physics from 1999 to 2000. He joined the University of Nevada, Reno as an assistant professor in 2001, became an associate professor in 2006, and became a professor in 2010.

== Research ==
=== Atomic structure and atomic clocks ===
Derevianko has developed relativistic many-body methods for precision calculations of atomic properties. In a 2000 Physical Review Letters paper, he calculated a correction from the Breit interaction to parity nonconservation in caesium and found that it substantially reduced the then-reported discrepancy between the measurement and the Standard Model. The American Physical Society's 2008 fellowship citation recognized this work, his analysis of non-dipole corrections in photoionization, and his higher-order atomic many-body calculations.

In 2004, Sergey Porsev, Derevianko, and E. N. Fortson proposed an ytterbium optical lattice clock based on the highly forbidden ^{1}S_{0}–^{3}P_{0} transition in ytterbium isotopes. The ^{171}Yb transition is now included in the BIPM's CIPM List of Frequencies as a secondary representation of the definition of the second. Derevianko later coauthored with Hidetoshi Katori a review of optical lattice clocks and methods for suppressing their systematic frequency shifts.

=== Quantum sensors and exotic physics ===
In 2014, Derevianko and Maxim Pospelov proposed searching for transient changes in fundamental constants caused by topological-defect dark matter by comparing geographically separated atomic clocks. The proposal included using clocks aboard Global Positioning System satellites. An analysis by Derevianko and collaborators of 16 years of archival GPS data found no such transient signal and constrained the proposed interactions over a range of defect sizes. He has also advocated linked networks of precision clocks and public archives of precision-measurement data for future searches as new theoretical models are developed.

In 2018, Derevianko modeled how ultralight dark matter could induce stochastic variations in fundamental constants such as the fine-structure constant and proposed searching for the resulting correlated frequency shifts with a network of atomic clocks.

In 2021, Derevianko, Derek Jackson Kimball, and collaborators proposed extending multi-messenger astronomy to searches for signals from physics beyond the Standard Model. Their model treated worldwide networks of atomic clocks and atomic magnetometers as "exotic-field telescopes" for bursts of ultralight fields that might accompany compact-object mergers. Because such low-mass fields would travel slightly slower than gravitational waves and produce a characteristic time-dependent signal in the sensors, a gravitational-wave observation could trigger a coordinated search in the quantum-sensor data.

=== Nuclear clocks ===
Derevianko was a coauthor of a 2012 design study of a single-ion clock based on the low-energy nuclear transition in ^{229}Th. The study identified clock states intended to suppress environmental shifts and estimated a fractional systematic uncertainty of about 1.5×10^{−19}.

In 2024, he was part of a University of California, Los Angeles-led collaboration that reported laser excitation of the ^{229}Th isomeric transition in a solid-state host. The result was one of three independent laser-excitation reports published within four months, an advance that enabled efforts to turn the transition into an operating nuclear clock.

In 2025, Derevianko and collaborators developed a quantitative theory of internal conversion of the ^{229}Th isomer in solid-state hosts. They modeled the nonradiative transfer of nuclear energy to an electron in the host and found that, when allowed by the material's electronic structure, internal conversion could quench the isomer on a millisecond timescale, compared with a radiative lifetime of roughly 1,000 seconds. The theory identified the energies of electronic defect states and the thorium doping concentration as constraints on the choice of clock material. In related work, the collaboration observed laser-induced quenching and proposed that deliberately engineered electronic defects could instead make internal conversion useful by shortening clock readout and reset times and improving clock stability.

In a 2025 study, Derevianko and collaborators developed a method for calculating the isomer shift in ^{229}Th nuclear clocks. This shift arises because the electronic environment interacts differently with the ground and excited states of the nucleus, which have different charge distributions. From calculations for several solid-state hosts and thorium sites, they estimated a search window about 80 MHz wide for locating the transition in new materials.

A 2025 Nature paper coauthored by Derevianko reported laser-based conversion-electron Mössbauer spectroscopy in ^{229}ThO_{2}. The method extended laser spectroscopy of the isomer to materials whose band gap is below the nuclear transition energy. The authors proposed exploiting internal conversion, which was about 10^{8} times faster than radiative decay in this system, to shorten clock interrogation cycles and to enable an electrical-current readout that could simplify and miniaturize a solid-state clock. In that paper, Derevianko and collaborators also developed a first-principles theory of band-to-band internal conversion, in which the decaying nucleus promotes an electron from the valence band to the conduction band.

== Honors ==
- Fellow of the American Physical Society (2008).
- Simons Fellow in Theoretical Physics (2014).
- Fellow of the American Association for the Advancement of Science (2023).
