= Martin Deutsch =

Austrian-American physicist

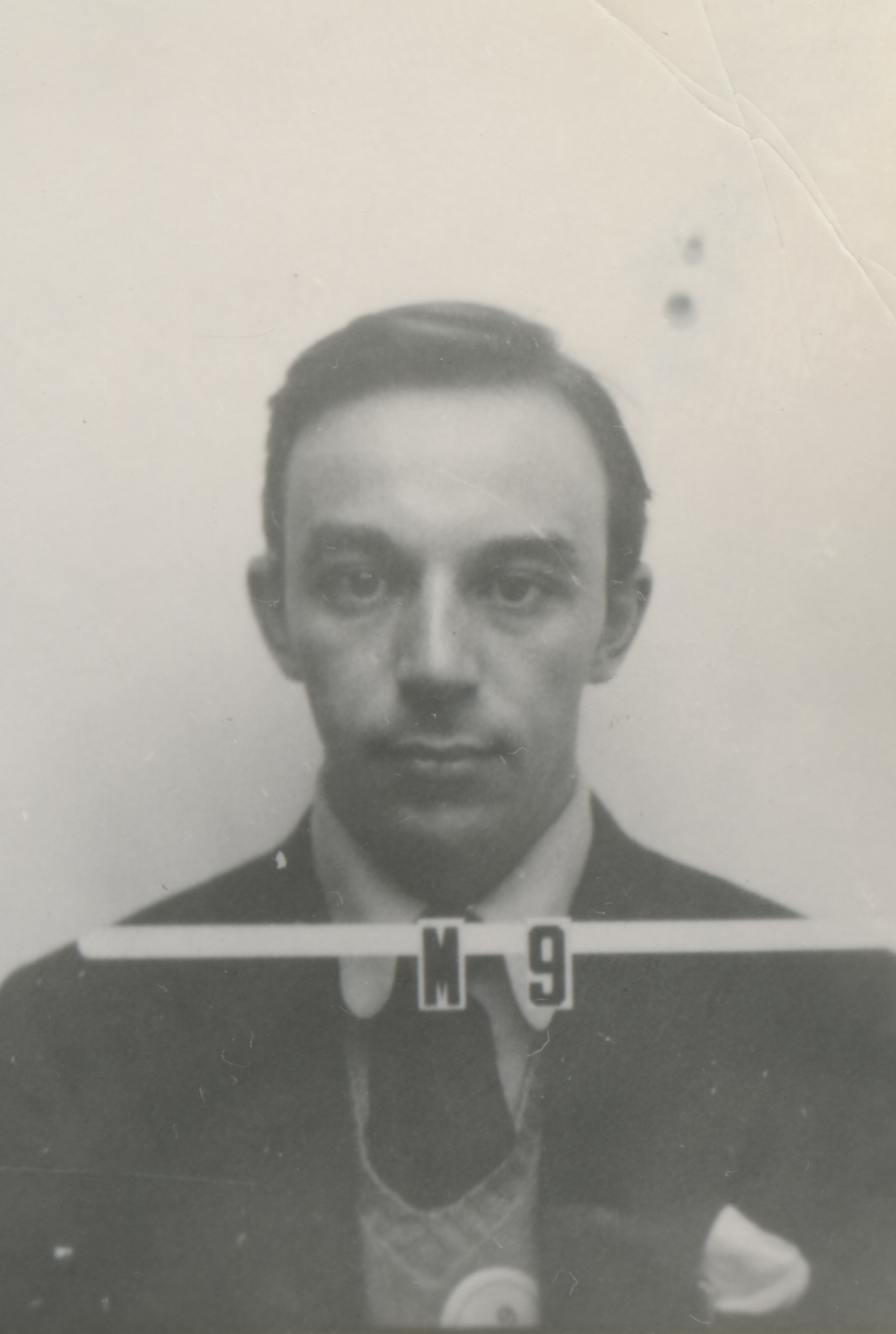
- Deutsch's ID badge photo from Los Alamos
- Born: 29 January 1917; Vienna, Austria-Hungary
- Died: 16 August 2002 (aged 85); Cambridge, Massachusetts
- Education: MIT
- Known for: Discovery of positronium
- Scientific career
- Fields: Physics
- Workplaces: Manhattan Project; MIT
- Doctoral advisor: Robley D. Evans
- Doctoral students: Henry Kendall

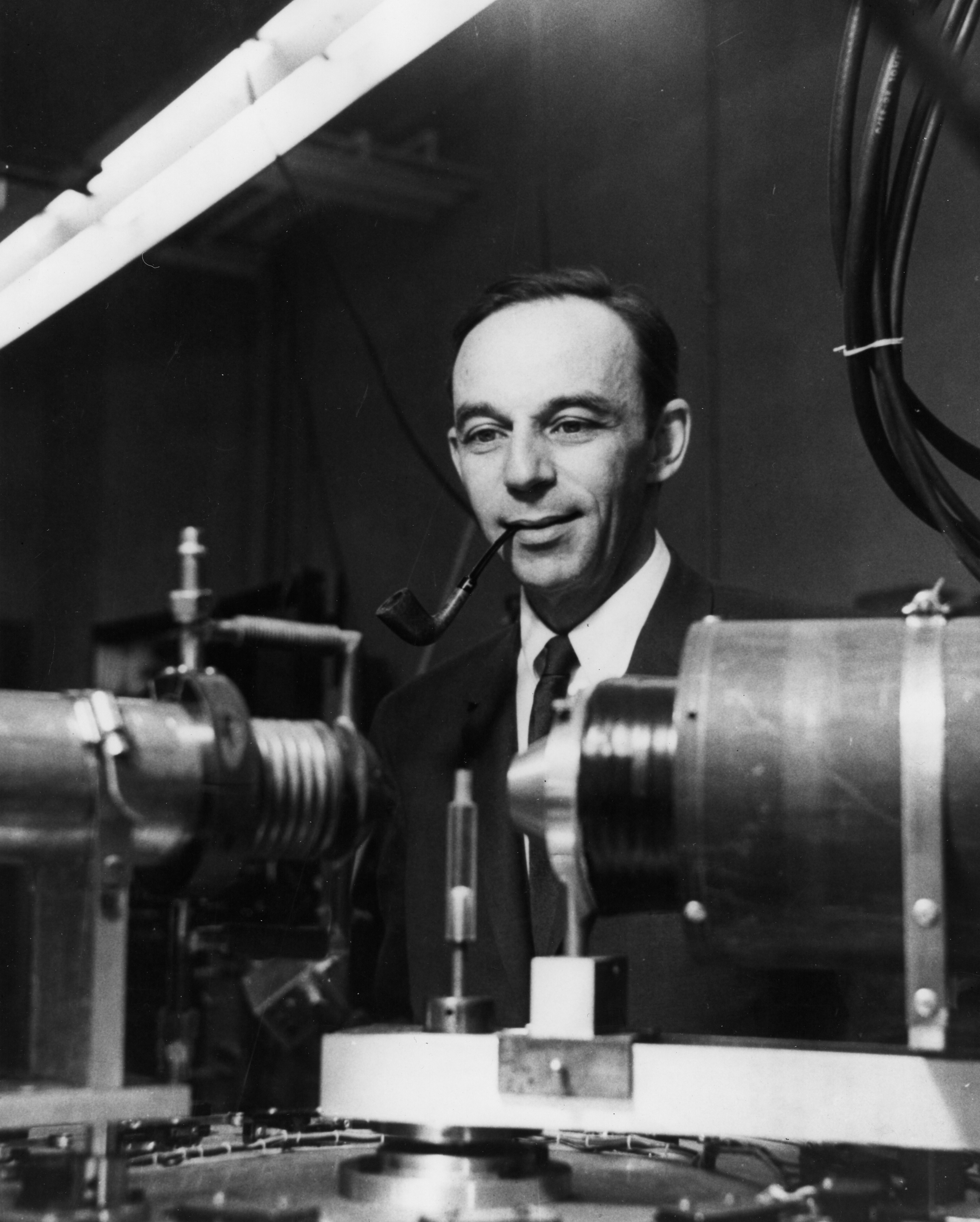
Martin Deutsch sits behind an "angular correlation apparatus at the Massachusetts Institute of Technology" smoking a pipe.

Martin Deutsch (29 January 1917 – 16 August 2002) was an Austrian-American professor of physics at MIT. He is best known for being the discoverer of positronium.

== Early life ==
Deutsch was born in Vienna during the First World War to a Jewish family. Both of his parents were physicians; his mother Helene Deutsch was a professor of psychiatry at the University of Vienna and a student and colleague of Sigmund Freud.

In 1934, after the Fascist seizure of power in Austria, Deutsch moved to Zürich, Switzerland. He completed secondary school there and attended the Swiss Federal Institute of Technology for one semester.

The following year, young Martin Deutsch accompanied his mother on a trip to the United States. During their outbound journey, the Italians invaded Ethiopia; the family decided that it would be best to resettle in America. They moved to Cambridge, Massachusetts, where both parents became influential psychiatrists.

Deutsch enrolled at MIT, where he excelled at mathematics and physics. He received his BS degree in 1937, after two years of study. In 1939, he married Suzanne Zeitlin, a native Bostonian who had just graduated from Simmons College with a master's degree in social work. They had two children, L. Peter Deutsch and Nicholas Deutsch. Martin earned his Ph.D. in physics in 1941, under Robley D. Evans leading to a thesis entitled: A Study of Nuclear Radiations by Means of a Magnetic Lens Beta Ray Spectrometer.

== Work on the Manhattan Project ==
Since Deutsch was still a German subject in 1941 (Germany annexed Austria in 1938; under the Nuremberg Laws, Jews were stripped of their citizenship and considered "subjects" of the Reich), he was classified by the U.S. Government as an enemy alien. Deutsch was a committed anti-fascist, and wanted to help in the war effort, and so he had to wait for two years to receive a security clearance. During that time, he taught and did research at MIT.

Deutsch arrived at Los Alamos in 1943, and began working closely with Emilio Segrè on problems concerning fission physics. He also worked with his future colleague at MIT, Victor Weisskopf. As it turned out, they had attended the same high school in Vienna, but not at the same time: Weisskopf graduated the year that Deutsch entered the school.

== Career at MIT ==
Deutsch returned to MIT in 1946, joining his Los Alamos colleagues Victor Weisskopf and Bruno Rossi. One of his students was Henry Kendall, who won the Nobel Prize for Physics in 1990. He also recruited Samuel C. C. Ting to the faculty; Ting was awarded the Nobel Prize for Physics in 1976.

In 1951, Deutsch measured and confirmed the existence of positronium, a bound state of electrons and positrons whirling about each other. The properties of positronium were predicted by Carl D. Anderson of Caltech in 1932.

The Martin Deutsch Student Award was created in 1987 to recognize outstanding experimental work by an MIT physics graduate student.

Deutsch died in 2002 at his home in Cambridge, Massachusetts.

== See also ==
- MIT Physics Department
