= MIT Department of Physics =

Academic department at the Massachusetts Institute of Technology

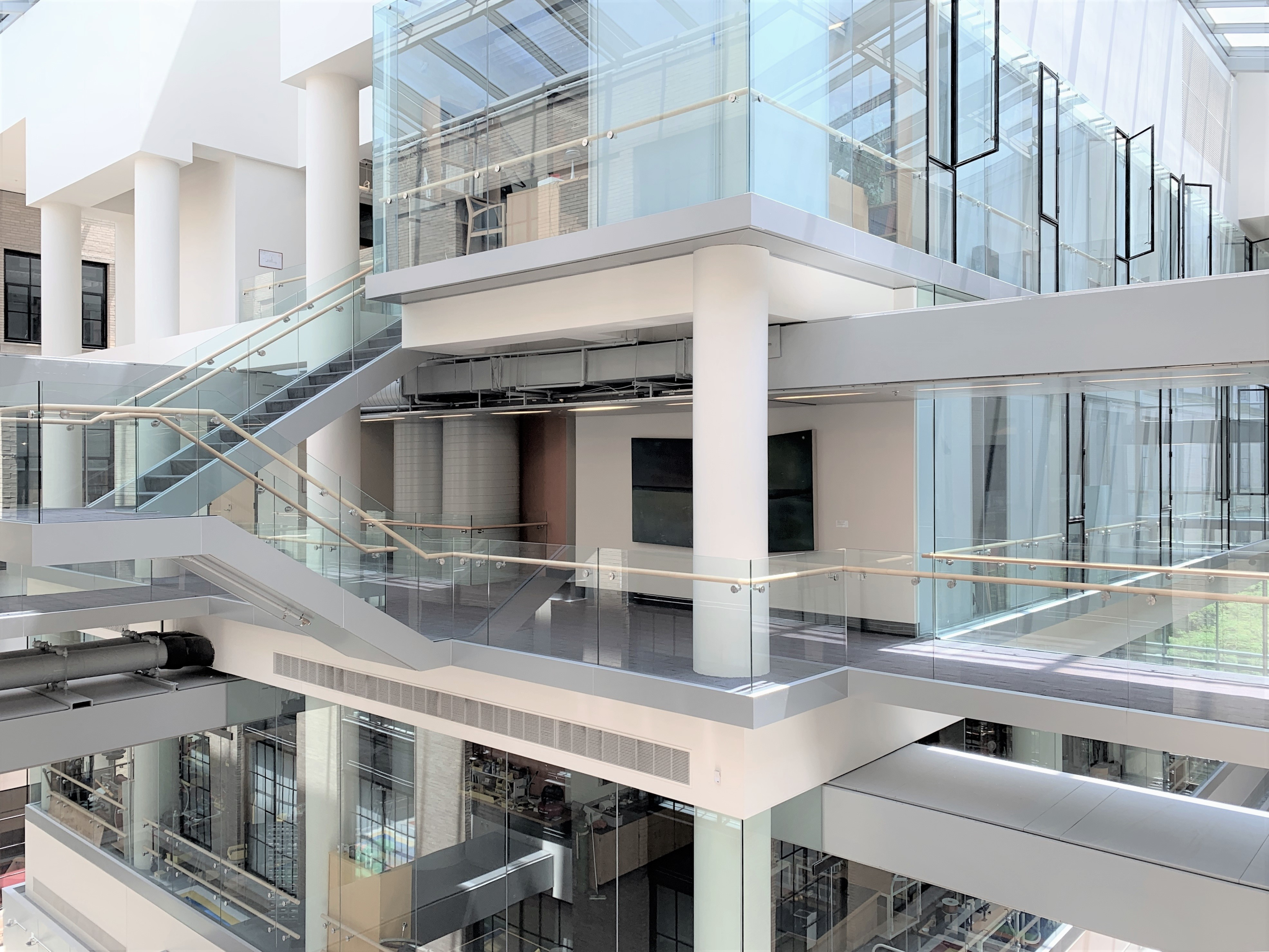
Building 6C is located at the core of the MIT Physics Department. Laboratories are often distributed throughout campus depending on their research areas.

The MIT Department of Physics has over 120 faculty members, is often cited as the largest physics department in the United States, and hosts top-ranked programs. It offers the SB, SM, PhD, and ScD degrees. Fourteen alumni of the department and nine current or former faculty members (two of whom were also students at MIT) have won the Nobel Prize in Physics.The Department of Physics was born when MIT founder William Barton Rogers proposed in 1865 to bring their Mens et Manus philosophy to life by creating a new laboratory of physics and mechanics in another department’s back room.

== Academics ==
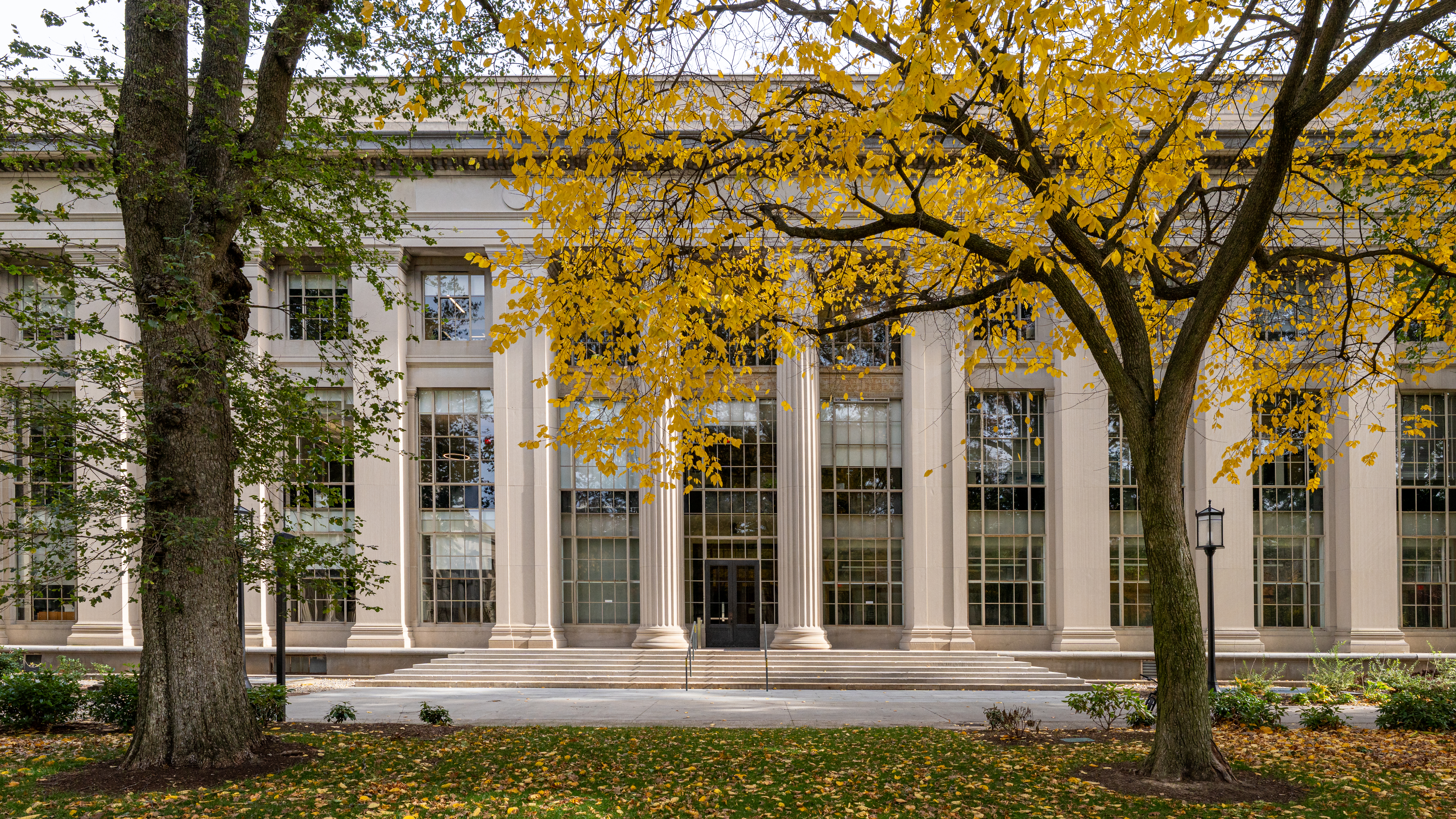
Headquartered in the Maclaurin Buildings (Building 4)

=== Undergraduate academics ===
There are two paths to earning a bachelor's degree (SB) in physics from MIT. The first, "Course 8 Focused Option", is for students intending to continue studying physics in graduate school. The track offers a rigorous education in various fields in fundamental physics including classical and quantum mechanics, statistical physics, general relativity, electrodynamics, and higher mathematics.

The second, "Course 8 Flexible Option" is designed for those students who would like to develop a strong background in physics but who would like to branch off into other research directions or more unconventional career paths, such as information theory, computer science, finance, and biophysics. A significant part of the student's third and fourth undergraduate years are left open for relevant electives and graduate classes, which then form a specialization. Both tracks have a strong emphasis on laboratory instruction, with the third year often reserved for two "Junior Lab" courses. Most students partaking in undergraduate research or a research-oriented internship.

=== Graduate academics ===
The department offers doctoral degrees in the following divisions: astrophysics, atomic and optical physics, biophysics, experimental condensed matter physics, theoretical condensed matter physics, experimental nuclear/particle physics, theoretical nuclear/particle physics, plasma physics, and quantum computing.

== Research ==
The department is divided into four main research areas, namely a) astrophysics, b) atomic, biophysics, condensed matter, and plasma physics, c) experimental nuclear and particle physics, and d) theoretical nuclear and particle physics. A large amount of research is conducted the department's 17 affiliated labs and centers, a list which includes the Research Laboratory of Electronics, the Plasma Science and Fusion Center, the Center for Theoretical Physics, the Condensed Matter Theory Group, the MIT–Harvard Center for Ultracold Atoms, and LIGO.

== Notable faculty ==
The Nobel laureates in the faculty are:

- Charles Townes (1964)
- Samuel C.C. Ting (1976)
- Steven Weinberg (1979)
- Jerome I. Friedman (1990)
- Henry Kendall (1990)
- Clifford Shull (1994)
- Wolfgang Ketterle (2001)
- Frank Wilczek (2004)
- Rainer Weiss (2017)

== Notable alumni ==
See also Massachusetts Institute of Technology School of Science alumni for a longer list

Nobel laureates

- Eric Cornell (PhD 1990), Bose–Einstein condensate
- Richard Feynman (SB 1939), quantum electrodynamics
- Murray Gell-Mann (PhD 1951), quarks
- Henry Kendall (PhD 1955), deep inelastic scattering
- Robert Laughlin (PhD 1979), fractional quantum Hall effect
- William D. Phillips (PhD 1976), laser cooling
- Burton Richter (SB 1952, PhD 1956), J/psi particle
- Adam Riess (SB 1992), high-Z supernova search team
- John Robert Schrieffer (SB 1953), BCS theory
- William Shockley (PhD 1936), transistor
- George Smoot (SB 1966, PhD 1970), cosmic microwave background radiation
- Carl E. Wieman (SB 1973), Bose–Einstein condensate
- Rainer Weiss (SB 1965, PhD 1962), LIGO
- Andrea Ghez (SB 1982), supermassive black hole in galaxy

Other major physics discoveries

- Gerald Guralnik (SB 1958), Higgs mechanism and Higgs boson
- Carl Richard Hagen (SB & SM 1958, PhD 1962), Higgs mechanism and Higgs boson

Breakthrough Prizes in Fundamental Physics

- Alan Guth (SB & SM 1969, PhD 1972), theory of inflation
- Cumrun Vafa (SB 1981), string theory
- Andrew Strominger (PhD 1982), string theory
- Charles L. Bennett (PhD 1984), WMAP
- Charles Kane (PhD 1989), topological insulators
- Eugene Mele (PhD 1978), topological insulators

In government

- Solomon J. Buchsbaum (PhD 1957), chair of White House Science Council under Bush and Reagan
- Shirley Ann Jackson (SB 1968, PhD 1973), chair of US Nuclear Regulatory Commission, president of RPI, second black woman to earn a physics PhD in the U.S.
- Lucas Papademos (SB 1970), prime minister of Greece

Astronauts

- Ronald McNair (PhD 1976), Challenger astronaut
- Jerome J. Apt (PhD 1976)
- John M. Grunsfeld (SB 1980)
- Timothy Creamer (SM 1992)
- Neil Woodward (SB 1984)

== See also ==
- List of computational physics software
- Physical Science Study Committee, a leader in modernization of science teaching in the 2nd half of the 20th century.
