= Richard E. Taylor =

Canadian physicist (1929–2018)

Richard Taylor CC FRS FRSC
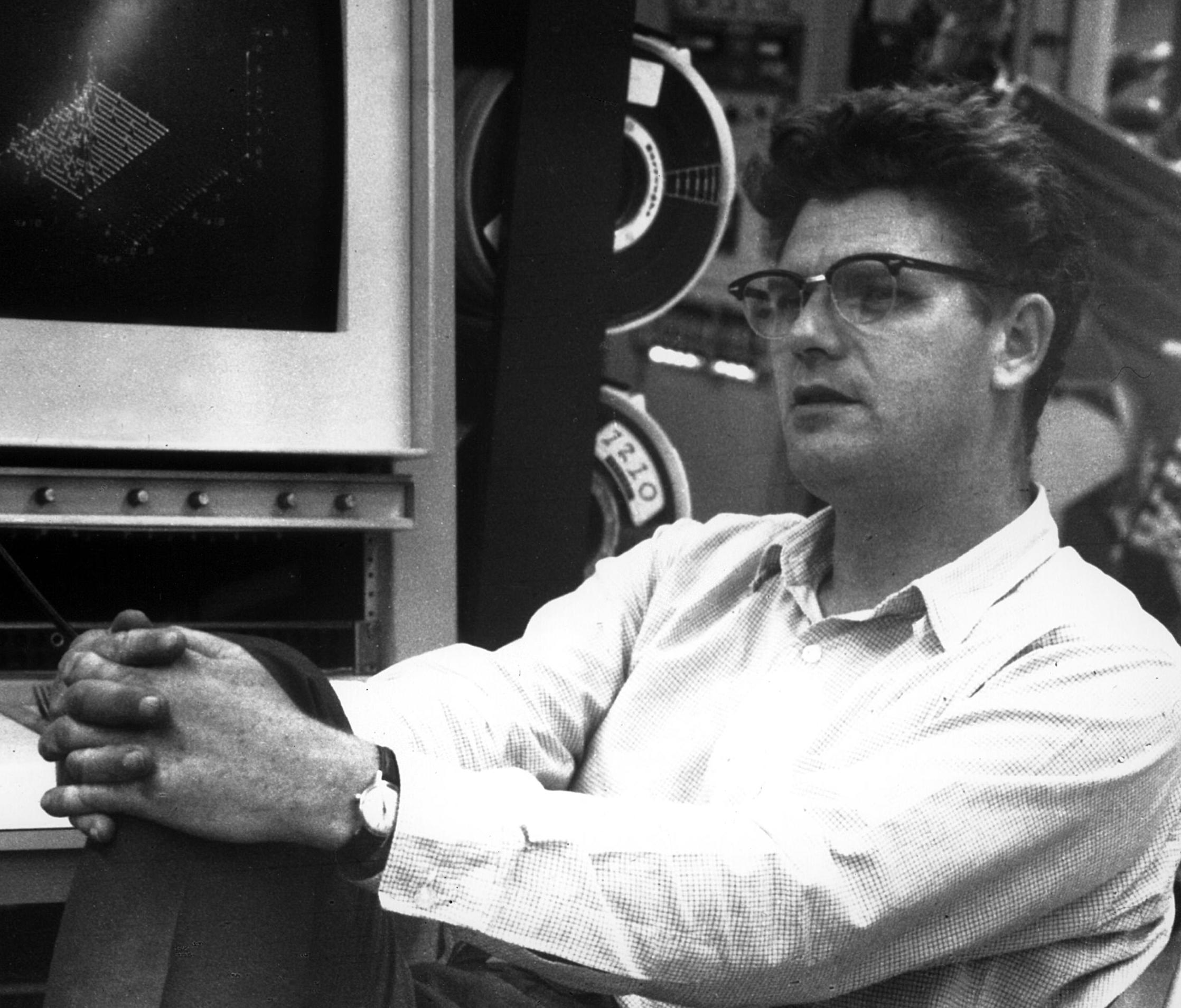
- Taylor in 1967
- Born: Richard Edward Taylor; 2 November 1929; Medicine Hat, Alberta, Canada
- Died: 22 February 2018 (aged 88); Stanford, California, U.S.
- Education: University of Alberta (BSc, MSc); Stanford University (PhD)
- Awards: Nobel Prize in Physics (1990); FRS (1997)
- Scientific career
- Fields: Particle physics
- Workplaces: Stanford Linear Accelerator Center; Lawrence Berkeley Laboratory; École Normale Supérieure
- Thesis: Positive pion production by polarised bremsstrahlung (1962)
- Doctoral advisor: Robert F. Mozley

Richard Edward Taylor (2 November 1929 – 22 February 2018), was a Canadian physicist and Stanford University professor. He shared the 1990 Nobel Prize in Physics with Jerome Friedman and Henry Kendall "for their pioneering investigations concerning deep inelastic scattering of electrons on protons and bound neutrons, which have been of essential importance for the development of the quark model in particle physics."

== Early life ==
Taylor was born in Medicine Hat, Alberta. He studied for his BSc (1950) and MSc (1952) degrees at the University of Alberta in Edmonton, Canada. Newly married, he applied to work for a PhD degree at Stanford University, where he joined the High Energy Physics Laboratory.

His PhD thesis was on an experiment using polarised gamma rays to study pion production.

== Research and career ==
After three years at the École Normale Supérieure in Paris and a year at the Lawrence Berkeley Laboratory in California, Taylor returned to Stanford. Construction of the Stanford Linear Accelerator Center (now the SLAC National Accelerator Laboratory) was beginning. In collaboration with researchers from the California Institute of Technology and the Massachusetts Institute of Technology, Taylor worked on the design and construction of the equipment, and was involved in many of the experiments.

In 1971, Taylor was awarded a Guggenheim fellowship that allowed him to spend a sabbatical year at CERN.

The experiments run at SLAC in the late 1960s and early 1970s involved scattering high-energy beams of electrons from protons and deuterons and heavier nuclei. At lower energies, it had already been found that the electrons would only be scattered through low angles, consistent with the idea that the nucleons had no internal structure. However, the SLAC-MIT experiments showed that higher energy electrons could be scattered through much higher angles, with the loss of some energy. These deep inelastic scattering results provided the first experimental evidence that the protons and neutrons were made up of point-like particles, later identified to be the up and down quarks that had previously been proposed on theoretical grounds. The experiments also provided the first evidence for the existence of gluons. Taylor, Friedman and Kendall were jointly awarded the Nobel Prize in 1990 for this work.

== Death ==
Taylor died at his home in Stanford, California near the campus of Stanford University on 22 February 2018 at the age of 88.

== Awards and honours ==
Taylor has received numerous awards and honours including:

- Alexander von Humboldt Senior Scientist Award, 1982.
- W.K.H. Panofsky Prize, 1989.
- Nobel Prize in Physics, 1990.
- Golden Plate Award, American Academy of Achievement, 1991.
- Fellow, Guggenheim Foundation, 1971 – 1972.
- Fellow, American Physical Society, 1986.
- Fellow, American Association for the Advancement of Science.
- Elected a Fellow of the Royal Society (FRS) in 1997
- Fellow, Royal Society of Canada.
- Member, American Academy of Arts and Sciences.
- Member, Canadian Association of Physicists.
- Foreign Associate, National Academy of Sciences.
- Companion of the Order of Canada, 2005.

== In popular culture ==
In May 2019, the announcement of the 1990 Nobel Prize for physics was featured on the season 2 finale of the TV series Young Sheldon. "A Swedish Science Thing and the Equation for Toast" featured Sheldon Cooper as a child, listening to a short wave radio as the Nobel Prize was announced in Sweden.
