= Positronium =

Bound state of an electron and positron

An electron and positron orbiting around their common centre of mass. An s state has zero angular momentum, so orbiting around each other would mean going straight at each other until the pair of particles is either scattered or annihilated, whichever occurs first. This is a bound quantum state known as positronium.

Positronium (Ps) is a system consisting of an electron and its anti-particle, a positron, bound together into an exotic atom, specifically an onium. Unlike hydrogen, the system has no protons. The system is unstable: the two particles annihilate each other to predominantly produce two or three gamma-rays, depending on the relative spin states. The energy levels of the two particles are similar to that of the hydrogen atom (which is a bound state of a proton and an electron). However, because of the reduced mass, the frequencies of the spectral lines are less than half of those for the corresponding hydrogen lines.

== States ==
The mass of positronium is 1.022 MeV, which is twice the electron mass minus the binding energy of a few eV. The lowest energy orbital state of positronium is 1S, and like with hydrogen, it has a hyperfine structure arising from the relative orientations of the spins of the electron and the positron. The singlet state, ^{1}S_{0}, known as para-positronium (p-Ps) has spins that add to zero while the triplet state, or orthopositronium (o-Ps) has spins that add to one.

The singlet state has a mean lifetime of 0.12 ns and decays preferentially into two gamma rays with energy of 511 keV each (in the center-of-mass frame). Para-positronium can decay into any even number of photons (2, 4, 6, ...), but the probability quickly decreases with the number: the branching ratio for decay into 4 photons is 1.439(2)×10^{−6}.

The triplet states, ^{3}S_{1}, with parallel spins (S = 1, M_{s} = −1, 0, 1) have an energy that is approximately 0.001 eV higher than the singlet. These states have a mean lifetime of 142.05±0.02 ns, and the leading decay produces three gamma rays. Other modes of decay are negligible; for instance, the five-photons mode has branching ratio of ≈10^{−6}. The three orders of magnitude difference in lifetime allows the two states to be studied separately.

Para-positronium lifetime in vacuum is approximately
$$t_0 = \frac{2 \hbar}{m_\mathrm{e} c^2 \alpha^5} = 0.1244 ~\mathrm{ns}.$$
Ortho-positronium lifetime in vacuum can be calculated approximately as:
$$t_1 = \frac{\frac{1}{2} 9 h}{2 m_\mathrm{e} c^2 \alpha^6 (\pi^2 - 9)} = 138.6 ~\mathrm{ns}.$$
More accurate calculations with corrections to O(α^{2}) yield a value of 7.040 μs^{−1} for the decay rate, corresponding to a lifetime of 142 ns.

Positronium in the 2S state is metastable having a lifetime of 1100 ns against annihilation. The positronium created in such an excited state will quickly cascade down to the ground state, where annihilation will occur more quickly.

=== Measurements ===
Measurements of these lifetimes and energy levels have been used in precision tests of quantum electrodynamics, confirming quantum electrodynamics (QED) predictions to high precision.

Annihilation can proceed via a number of channels, each producing gamma rays with total energy of 1022 keV (sum of the electron and positron mass-energy), usually 2 or 3, with up to 5 gamma ray photons recorded from a single annihilation.

The annihilation into a neutrino–antineutrino pair is also possible, but the probability is predicted to be negligible. The branching ratio for o-Ps decay for this channel is 6.2×10^{−18} (electron neutrino–antineutrino pair) and 9.5×10^{−21} (for other flavour) in predictions based on the Standard Model, but it can be increased by non-standard neutrino properties, like relatively high magnetic moment. The experimental upper limits on branching ratio for this decay (as well as for a decay into any "invisible" particles) are <4.3×10^{−7} for p-Ps and <4.2×10^{−7} for o-Ps.

== Energy levels ==
While precise calculation of positronium energy levels uses the Bethe–Salpeter equation or the Breit equation, the similarity between positronium and hydrogen allows a rough estimate. In this approximation, the energy levels are different because of a different effective mass, μ, in the energy equation (see electron energy levels for a derivation):
$$E_n = -\frac{\mu q_\mathrm{e}^4}{8 h^2 \varepsilon_0^2} \frac{1}{n^2},$$
where:

- q_{e} is the charge magnitude of the electron (same as the positron),
- h is the Planck constant,
- ε_{0} is the electric constant (otherwise known as the permittivity of free space),
- μ is the reduced mass:
  $$\mu = \frac{m_\mathrm{e} m_\mathrm{p}}{m_\mathrm{e} + m_\mathrm{p}} = \frac{m_\mathrm{e}^2}{2m_\mathrm{e}} = \frac{m_\mathrm{e}}{2},$$
  where m_{e} and m_{p} are, respectively, the mass of the electron and the positron (which are the same by definition as antiparticles).

Thus, for positronium, its reduced mass only differs from the electron by a factor of 2. This causes the energy levels to also roughly be half of what they are for the hydrogen atom.

So finally, the energy levels of positronium are given by
$$E_n = -\frac{1}{2} \frac{m_\mathrm{e} q_\mathrm{e}^4}{8 h^2 \varepsilon_0^2} \frac{1}{n^2} = \frac{-6.8~\mathrm{eV}}{n^2}.$$

The lowest energy level of positronium (n = 1) is −6.8 eV. The next level is −1.7 eV. The negative sign is a convention that implies a bound state. Positronium can also be considered by a particular form of the two-body Dirac equation; two particles with a Coulomb interaction can be exactly separated in the (relativistic) center-of-momentum frame and the resulting ground-state energy has been obtained very accurately using finite element methods of Janine Shertzer. Their results lead to the discovery of anomalous states. The Dirac equation whose Hamiltonian comprises two Dirac particles and a static Coulomb potential is not relativistically invariant. But if one adds the 1/c^{2n} (or α^{2n}, where α is the fine-structure constant) terms, where n = 1,2..., then the result is relativistically invariant. Only the leading term is included. The α^{2} contribution is the Breit term; workers rarely go to α^{4} because at α^{3} one has the Lamb shift, which requires quantum electrodynamics.

== Formation and decay in materials ==
After a radioactive atom in a material undergoes a β^{+} decay (positron emission), the resulting high-energy positron slows down by colliding with atoms, and eventually annihilates with one of the many electrons in the material. It may however first form positronium before the annihilation event. The understanding of this process is of some importance in positron emission tomography. Approximately:

- ~60% of positrons will directly annihilate with an electron without forming positronium. The annihilation usually results in two gamma rays. In most cases this direct annihilation occurs only after the positron has lost its excess kinetic energy and has thermalized with the material.
- ~10% of positrons form para-positronium, which then promptly (in ~0.12 ns) decays, usually into two gamma rays.
- ~30% of positrons form ortho-positronium but then annihilate within a few nanoseconds by 'picking off' another nearby electron with opposing spin. This usually produces two gamma rays. During this time, the very lightweight positronium atom exhibits a strong zero-point motion, that exerts a pressure and is able to push out a tiny nanometer-sized bubble in the medium.
- Only ~0.5% of positrons form ortho-positronium that self-decays (usually into three gamma rays). This natural decay rate of ortho-positronium is relatively slow (~140 ns decay lifetime), compared to the aforementioned pick-off process, which is why the three-gamma decay rarely occurs.

== History ==
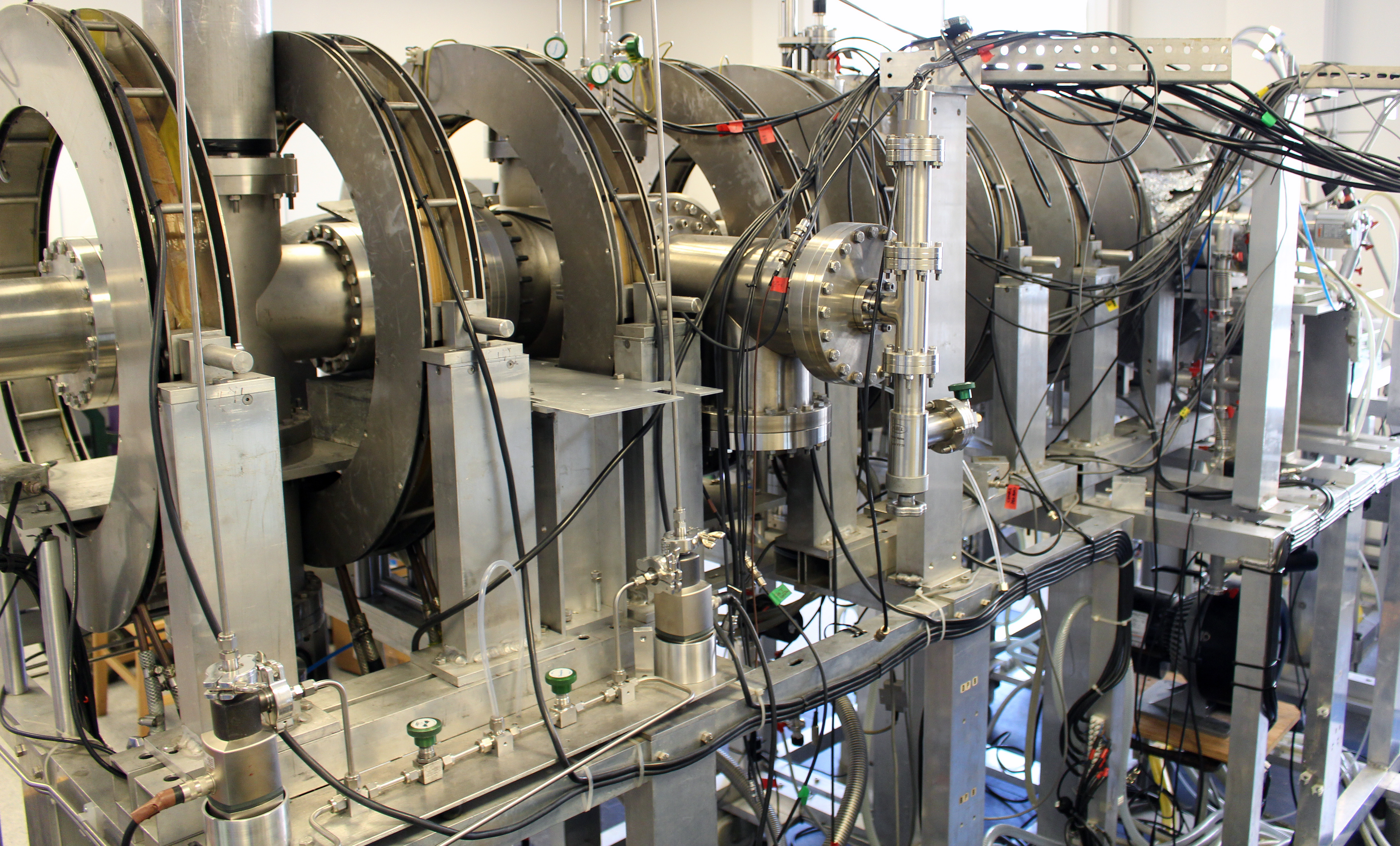
The Positronium Beam at University College London, a lab used to study the properties of positronium.

The Croatian physicist Stjepan Mohorovičić predicted the existence of a bound state of an electron and a positron in a 1934 article published in Astronomische Nachrichten, in which he called it the "electrum", although he at the time did not identify the positron with Dirac's antielectron. In 1945 Arthur Ruark suggested the name positronium for the simplest electron-positron unstable atom, while at the same time John Wheeler worked on a longer paper on the topic of polyelectrons. While both authors unknowingly reproduced some of Mohorovičić’s results, such as the size and optical spectrum of the positronium atom, they also recognized that the positron was an antielectron and that the atom would therefore decay by annihilation into pure radiation energy.

Positronium was experimentally discovered by Martin Deutsch at MIT in 1951. Many subsequent experiments have precisely measured its properties and verified predictions of quantum electrodynamics.

A discrepancy known as the ortho-positronium lifetime puzzle persisted for some time, but was resolved with further calculations and measurements. Measurements were in error because of the lifetime measurement of unthermalised positronium, which was produced at only a small rate. This had yielded lifetimes that were too long. Also calculations using relativistic quantum electrodynamics are difficult, so they had been done to only the first order. Corrections that involved higher orders were then calculated in a non-relativistic quantum electrodynamics.

In 2024, the AEgIS collaboration at CERN was the first to cool positronium by laser light, leaving it available for experimental use. The substance was brought to −100 °C (−148 °F) using laser cooling.

== Exotic compounds ==
The positronium negative ion exists as a bound state and its first observation was reported in 1981 by Allen Mills.

Molecular bonding was predicted for positronium. Molecules of positronium hydride (PsH) can be made. Positronium can also form a cyanide and can form bonds with halogens or lithium.

The first observation of di-positronium (Ps_{2}) molecules—molecules consisting of two positronium atoms—was reported on 12 September 2007 by David Cassidy and Allen Mills from University of California, Riverside.

Unlike muonium, positronium does not have a nucleus analogue, because the electron and the positron have equal masses. Consequently, while muonium tends to behave like a light isotope of hydrogen, positronium shows large differences in size, polarisability, and binding energy from hydrogen.

== Natural occurrence ==
The events in the early universe leading to baryon asymmetry predate the formation of atoms (including exotic varieties such as positronium) by around a third of a million years, so no positronium atoms occurred then.

Likewise, the naturally occurring positrons in the present day result from high-energy interactions such as in cosmic ray–atmosphere interactions, and so are too hot (thermally energetic) to form electrical bonds before annihilation.

== See also ==
- Antiprotonic helium
- Breit equation
- Di-positronium
- Exciton — solid-state analog
- Protonium
- Quantum electrodynamics
- Quarkonium
- Two-body Dirac equations
