= Two-body Dirac equations =

Quantum field theory equations

In quantum field theory, and in the significant subfields of quantum electrodynamics (QED) and quantum chromodynamics (QCD), the two-body Dirac equations (TBDE) of constraint dynamics provide a three-dimensional yet manifestly covariant reformulation of the Bethe–Salpeter equation for two spin-1/2 particles. Such a reformulation is necessary since without it, as shown by Nakanishi, the Bethe–Salpeter equation possesses negative-norm solutions arising from the presence of an essentially relativistic degree of freedom, the relative time. These "ghost" states have spoiled the naive interpretation of the Bethe–Salpeter equation as a quantum mechanical wave equation. The two-body Dirac equations of constraint dynamics rectify this flaw. The forms of these equations can not only be derived from quantum field theory they can also be derived purely in the context of Dirac's constraint dynamics and relativistic mechanics and quantum mechanics. Their structures, unlike the more familiar two-body Dirac equation of Breit, which is a single equation, are that of two simultaneous quantum relativistic wave equations. A single two-body Dirac equation similar to the Breit equation can be derived from the TBDE. Unlike the Breit equation, it is manifestly covariant and free from the types of singularities that prevent a strictly nonperturbative treatment of the Breit equation. In applications of the TBDE to QED, the two particles interact by way of four-vector potentials derived from the field theoretic electromagnetic interactions between the two particles. In applications to QCD, the two particles interact by way of four-vector potentials and Lorentz invariant scalar interactions, derived in part from the field theoretic chromomagnetic interactions between the quarks and in part by phenomenological considerations. As with the Breit equation a sixteen-component spinor Ψ is used.

== Equations ==
For QED, each equation has the same structure as the ordinary one-body Dirac equation in the presence of an external electromagnetic field, given by the 4-potential $A_\mu$. For QCD, each equation has the same structure as the ordinary one-body Dirac equation in the presence of an external field similar to the electromagnetic field and an additional external field given by in terms of a Lorentz invariant scalar $S$. In natural units: those two-body equations have the form.

$$\begin{align}
\left[(\gamma_1)_\mu (p_1-\tilde{A}_1)^\mu+m_1 + \tilde{S}_1\right] \Psi &= 0, \\[1ex]
\left[(\gamma_2)_\mu (p_2-\tilde{A}_2)^\mu+m_2 + \tilde{S}_2\right] \Psi &= 0.
\end{align}$$
where, in coordinate space, p^{μ} is the 4-momentum, related to the 4-gradient by (the metric used here is $\eta_{\mu\nu}=(-1,1,1,1)$)
$$p^\mu = -i \frac{\partial}{\partial x_\mu}$$
and γ^{μ} are the gamma matrices. The two-body Dirac equations (TBDE) have the property that if one of the masses becomes very large, say $m_2 \rightarrow \infty$ then the 16-component Dirac equation reduces to the 4-component one-body Dirac equation for particle one in an external potential.

In SI units:
$$\begin{align}
\left[(\gamma_1)_\mu (p_1-\tilde{A}_1)^\mu+m_1c + \tilde{S}_1\right] \Psi &= 0, \\[1ex]
\left[(\gamma_2)_\mu (p_2-\tilde{A}_2)^\mu+m_2c + \tilde{S}_2\right] \Psi &= 0.
\end{align}$$
where c is the speed of light and
$$p^\mu = -i\hbar \frac{\partial}{\partial x_\mu}$$

Natural units will be used below. A tilde symbol is used over the two sets of potentials to indicate that they may have additional gamma matrix dependencies not present in the one-body Dirac equation. Any coupling constants such as the electron charge are embodied in the vector potentials.

== Constraint dynamics and the TBDE ==
Constraint dynamics applied to the TBDE requires a particular form of mathematical consistency: the two Dirac operators must commute with each other. This is plausible if one views the two equations as two compatible constraints on the wave function. (See the discussion below on constraint dynamics.) If the two operators did not commute, (as, e.g., with the coordinate and momentum operators $x, p$) then the constraints would not be compatible (one could not e.g., have a wave function that satisfied both $x\Psi = 0$ and $p\Psi = 0$). This mathematical consistency or compatibility leads to three important properties of the TBDE. The first is a condition that eliminates the dependence on the relative time in the center of momentum (c.m.) frame defined by $P=p_1+p_2=(w,\vec 0)$. (The variable $w$ is the total energy in the c.m. frame.) Stated another way, the relative time is eliminated in a covariant way. In particular, for the two operators to commute, the scalar and four-vector potentials can depend on the relative coordinate $x=x_1 - x_2$ only through its component $x_{\perp }$ orthogonal to $P$ in which
$$x_\perp^\mu =(\eta^{\mu \nu }-P^\mu P^\nu /P^2)x_\nu, \,$$
$$P_\mu x_\perp^\mu =0. \,$$

This implies that in the c.m. frame $x_\perp =(0,\vec{x}=\vec{x}_1 -\vec{x}_2)$, which has zero time component.

Secondly, the mathematical consistency condition also eliminates the relative energy in the c.m. frame. It does this by imposing on each Dirac operator a structure such that in a particular combination they lead to this interaction independent form, eliminating in a covariant way the relative energy.
$$P\cdot p\Psi =(-P^0p^0+\vec P\cdot p)\Psi=0. \,$$

In this expression $p$ is the relative momentum having the form $(p_1 - p_2)/2$ for equal masses. In the c.m. frame ($P^0 = w, \vec P=\vec 0$), the time component $p^0$ of the relative momentum, that is the relative energy, is thus eliminated. in the sense that $p^0\Psi = 0$.

A third consequence of the mathematical consistency is that each of the world scalar $\tilde{S}_i$ and four vector $\tilde{A}_{i}^{\mu }$ potentials has a term with a fixed dependence on $\gamma _1$ and $\gamma _2$ in addition to the gamma matrix independent forms of $S_i$ and $A_i^\mu$ which appear in the ordinary one-body Dirac equation for scalar and vector potentials. These extra terms correspond to additional recoil spin-dependence not present in the one-body Dirac equation and vanish when one of the particles becomes very heavy (the so-called static limit).

== More on constraint dynamics: generalized mass shell constraints ==
Constraint dynamics arose from the work of Dirac and Bergmann. This section shows how the elimination of relative time and energy takes place in the c.m. system for the simple system of two relativistic spinless particles. Constraint dynamics was first applied to the classical relativistic two particle system by Todorov, Kalb and Van Alstine, Komar, and Droz–Vincent. With constraint dynamics, these authors found a consistent and covariant approach to relativistic canonical Hamiltonian mechanics that also evades the Currie–Jordan–Sudarshan "No Interaction" theorem. That theorem states that without fields, one cannot have a relativistic Hamiltonian dynamics. Thus, the same covariant three-dimensional approach which allows the quantized version of constraint dynamics to remove quantum ghosts simultaneously circumvents at the classical level the C.J.S. theorem. Consider a constraint on the otherwise independent coordinate and momentum four vectors, written in the form $\phi _i (p, x)\approx 0$. The symbol$\approx 0$ is called a weak equality and implies that the constraint is to be imposed only after any needed Poisson brackets are performed. In the presence of such constraints, the total Hamiltonian $\mathcal{H}$ is obtained from the Lagrangian $\mathcal{L}$ by adding to its Legendre transform $(p\dot{x}-\mathcal{L})$ the sum of the constraints times an appropriate set of Lagrange multipliers $(\lambda _{i})$.
$$\mathcal{H}=p\dot{x}-\mathcal{L}+\lambda _{i}\phi _{i},$$

This total Hamiltonian is traditionally called the Dirac Hamiltonian. Constraints arise naturally from parameter invariant actions of the form
$$I=\int d\tau \mathcal{L}(\tau ) = \int d\tau' \frac{d\tau }{d\tau'} \mathcal{L}(\tau )= \int d\tau' \mathcal{L}(\tau').$$

In the case of four vector and Lorentz scalar interactions for a single particle the Lagrangian is
$$\mathcal{L}(\tau)=-(m+S(x))\sqrt{-\dot{x}^2}+\dot{x}\cdot A(x) \,$$

The canonical momentum is
$$p = \frac{\partial \mathcal{L}}{\partial \dot{x}} = \frac{(m+S(x))\dot{x}}{\sqrt{-\dot{x}^2}} + A(x)$$
and by squaring leads to the generalized mass shell condition or generalized mass shell constraint
$$( p-A)^2 + (m+S)^2 =0. \,$$

Since, in this case, the Legendre Hamiltonian vanishes
$$p\cdot \dot{x}-\mathcal{L}=0, \,$$
the Dirac Hamiltonian is simply the generalized mass constraint (with no interactions it would simply be the ordinary mass shell constraint)
$$\mathcal{H} = \lambda \left[ \left( p-A\right)^2 + (m+S)^2 \right] \equiv \lambda (p^2 + m^2 + \Phi (x,p)).$$

One then postulates that for two bodies the Dirac Hamiltonian is the sum of two such mass shell constraints,
$$\mathcal{H}_i = p_i^2+m_i^2+\Phi_i (x_1,x_2,p_1,p_2)\approx 0, \,$$
that is
$$\begin{align}
\mathcal{H} &=\lambda_1[p_1^2+m_1^2+\Phi_1(x_1,x_2,p_1,p_2)] + \lambda_2[p_2^2 + m_2^2+\Phi_2(x_1,x_2,p_1,p_2)] \\[1ex]
&=\lambda_1 \mathcal{H}_1 + \lambda_2 \mathcal{H}_2,
\end{align}$$
and that each constraint $\mathcal{H}_i$ be constant in the proper time associated with $\mathcal{H}$
$$\dot{\mathcal{H}}_i = \{\mathcal{H}_i,\mathcal{H}\} \approx 0 \,$$

Here the weak equality means that the Poisson bracket could result in terms proportional one of the constraints, the classical Poisson brackets for the relativistic two-body system being defined by
$$\left\{O_1, O_2\right\} =
\frac{\partial O_1}{\partial x_1^\mu}
\frac{\partial O_2}{\partial p_{1\mu}}
-\frac{\partial O_1}{\partial p_1^\mu}
\frac{\partial O_2}{\partial x_{1\mu}}
+\frac{\partial O_1}{\partial x_2^\mu}
\frac{\partial O_2}{\partial p_{2\mu}}
-\frac{\partial O_1}{\partial p_2^\mu}
\frac{\partial O_2}{\partial x_{2\mu}}.$$

To see the consequences of having each constraint be a constant of the motion, take, for example
$$\dot{\mathcal{H}}_1
= \{\mathcal{H}_1,\mathcal{H}\}
= \lambda _1 \{\mathcal{H}_1, \mathcal{H}_1\}
+ \{\mathcal{H}_1,\lambda_1\} \mathcal{H}_2
+ \lambda_2\{\mathcal{H}_2,\mathcal{H}_1\}
+ \{\lambda _2,\mathcal{H}_1\} \mathcal{H}_2.$$

Since $\{\mathcal{H}_1,\mathcal{H}_1\}=0$ and $\mathcal{H}_1\approx 0$ and $\mathcal{H}_2 \approx 0$ one has
$$\dot{\mathcal{H}}_1\approx \lambda _2\{\mathcal{H}_2, \mathcal{H}_1\}\approx 0.$$

The simplest solution to this is
$$\Phi _1 =\Phi _2 \equiv \Phi (x_\perp )$$
which leads to (note the equality in this case is not a weak one in that no constraint need be imposed after the Poisson bracket is worked out)
$$\{\mathcal{H}_2,\mathcal{H}_1\}=0 \,$$
(see Todorov, and Wong and Crater ) with the same $x_\perp$ defined above.

== Quantization ==
In addition to replacing classical dynamical variables by their quantum counterparts, quantization of the constraint mechanics takes place by replacing the constraint on the dynamical variables with a restriction on the wave function
$$\mathcal{H}_{i}\approx 0\rightarrow \mathcal{H}_{i}\Psi = 0,$$
$$\mathcal{H} \approx 0\rightarrow \mathcal{H}\Psi = 0.$$

The first set of equations for i = 1, 2 play the role for spinless particles that the two Dirac equations play for spin-one-half particles. The classical Poisson brackets are replaced by commutators
$$\{O_1,O_2\}\rightarrow \frac{1}{i}[O_1,O_2]. \,$$

Thus
$$[\mathcal{H}_2,\mathcal{H}_1]=0, \,$$
and we see in this case that the constraint formalism leads to the vanishing commutator of the wave operators for the two particles. This is the analogue of the claim stated earlier that the two Dirac operators commute with one another.

== Covariant elimination of the relative energy ==
The vanishing of the above commutator ensures that the dynamics is independent of the relative time in the c.m. frame. In order to covariantly eliminate the relative energy, introduce the relative momentum $p$ defined by

| $p_1 =\frac{p_1\cdot P}{P^2}P+p\,,$ | 1 |

| $p_2 =\frac{p_2\cdot P}{P^2}P-p\,,$ | 2 |

The above definition of the relative momentum forces the orthogonality of the total momentum and the relative momentum,
$$P \cdot p = 0,$$
which follows from taking the scalar product of either equation with $P$. From Eqs.(1) and (2), this relative momentum can be written in terms of $p_1$ and $p_2$ as
$$p = \frac{\varepsilon _2}{\sqrt{-P^2}} p_1 - \frac{\varepsilon _1}{\sqrt{-P^2}} p_2$$

where
$$\varepsilon _1 =-\frac{p_1\cdot P}{\sqrt{-P^2}}=-\frac{P^2+p_1^2-p_2^2}{2\sqrt{-P^2}}$$
$$\varepsilon _2 =-\frac{p_2\cdot P}{\sqrt{-P^2}}=-\frac{P^2+p_2^2-p_1^2}{2\sqrt{-P^2}}$$
are the projections of the momenta $p_1$ and $p_2$ along the direction of the total momentum $P$. Subtracting the two constraints $\mathcal{H}_1\Psi =0$ and $\mathcal{H}_2\Psi =0$, gives

| $(p_1^2-p_2^2)\Psi =-(m_1^2-m_2^2)\Psi$ | 3 |

Thus on these states $\Psi$
$$\varepsilon _1\Psi =\frac{-P^2+m_1^2-m_2^2}{2\sqrt{-P^2}} \Psi$$
$$\varepsilon _2\Psi =\frac{-P^2+m_2^2-m_1^2}{2\sqrt{-P^2}} \Psi.$$

The equation $\mathcal{H}\Psi =0$ describes both the c.m. motion and the internal relative motion. To characterize the former motion, observe that since the potential $\Phi$ depends only on the difference of the two coordinates
$$[P,\mathcal{H}]\Psi = 0.$$

(This does not require that $[P,\lambda _{i}]=0$ since the $\mathcal{H}_{i} \Psi =0$.) Thus, the total momentum $P$ is a constant of motion and $\Psi$ is an eigenstate state characterized by a total momentum $P'$. In the c.m. system $P' = (w, \vec{0}),$ with $w$ the invariant center of momentum (c.m.) energy. Thus

| $(P^2+w^2)\Psi =0\,,$ | 4 |

and so $\Psi$ is also an eigenstate of c.m. energy operators for each of the two particles,
$$\varepsilon _1\Psi =\frac{w^2+m_1^2-m_2^2}{2w}\Psi$$
$$\varepsilon _2\Psi =\frac{w^2+m_2^2-m_1^2}{2w}\Psi.$$

The relative momentum then satisfies
$$p\Psi =\frac{\varepsilon _2p_1-\varepsilon _1p_2}{w}\Psi,$$
so that
$$p_1\Psi =\left( \frac{\varepsilon _1}{w}P+p\right) \Psi ,$$
$$p_2\Psi =\left( \frac{\varepsilon _2}{w}P-p\right) \Psi ,$$

The above set of equations follow from the constraints $\mathcal{H}_{i}\Psi = 0$ and the definition of the relative momenta given in Eqs.(1) and (2). If instead one chooses to define (for a more general choice see Horwitz),
$$\varepsilon _1 =\frac{w^2+m_1^2-m_2^2}{2w},$$
$$\varepsilon _2 =\frac{w^2+m_2^2-m_1^2}{2w},$$
$$p = \frac{\varepsilon _2p_1-\varepsilon _1p_2}{w},$$
independent of the wave function, then

| $p_1 = \frac{\varepsilon _1}{w}P+p,$ | 5 |

| $p_2 = \frac{\varepsilon _2}{w}P-p,$ | 6 |

and it is straight forward to show that the constraint Eq.(3) leads directly to:

| $P\cdot p\Psi =0,$ | 7 |

in place of $P\cdot p=0$. This conforms with the earlier claim on the vanishing of the relative energy in the c.m. frame made in conjunction with the TBDE. In the second choice the c.m. value of the relative energy is not defined as zero but comes from the original generalized mass shell constraints. The above equations for the relative and constituent four-momentum are the relativistic analogues of the non-relativistic equations
$$\begin{align}
\vec{p} &= \frac{m_2\vec{p}_1-m_1\vec{p}_2}{M}, \\[1ex]
\vec{p}_1 &= \frac{m_1}{M}\vec{P}+\vec{p}, \\[1ex]
\vec{p}_2 &= \frac{m_2}{M}\vec{P}-\vec{p}.
\end{align}$$

== Covariant eigenvalue equation for internal motion ==
Using Eqs.(5),(6),(7), one can write $\mathcal{H}$ in terms of $P$ and $p$

$$\mathcal{H}\Psi = \{\lambda _1[-\varepsilon_1^2 + m_1^2+p^2+\Phi (x_{\perp })] + \lambda_2 [-\varepsilon_2^2+m_2^2+p^2+\Phi (x_{\perp })]\}\Psi$$

| $=(\lambda _1+\lambda _2)[-b^2(-P^2;m_1^2,m_2^2)+p^2+\Phi (x_{\perp })] \Psi = 0 \, ,$ | 8 |

where

$$b^2(-P^2,m_1^2,m_2^2)=\varepsilon _1^2-m_1^2=\varepsilon_2^2-m_2^2\ = -\frac{1}{4P^2} (P^4+2P^2(m_1^2+m_2^2)+(m_1^2-m_2^2)^2)\,.$$

Eq.(8) contains both the total momentum $P$ [through the $b^2(-P^2, m_1^2, m_2^2)$] and the relative momentum $p$. Using Eq. (4), one obtains the eigenvalue equation

| $(\lambda _1+\lambda _2)\left\{ p^2+\Phi (x_{\perp})-b^2(w^2,m_1^2,m_2^2)\right\} \Psi =0\,,$ | 9 |

so that $b^2(w^2,m_1^2,m_2^2)$ becomes the standard triangle function displaying exact relativistic two-body kinematics:

$$b^2(w^2,m_1^2,m_2^2)=\frac{1}{4w^2}\left\{w^4-2w^2(m_1^2+m_2^2)+(m_1^2-m_2^2)^2\right\}\,.$$

With the above constraint Eqs.(7) on $\Psi$ then $p^2\Psi = p_{\perp }^2\Psi$ where $p_{\perp }=p-p\cdot PP/P^2$. This allows writing Eq. (9) in the form of an eigenvalue equation
$$\{p_{\perp }^2+\Phi (x_{\perp })\}\Psi=b^2(w^2,m_1^2,m_2^2)\Psi \,,$$

having a structure very similar to that of the ordinary three-dimensional nonrelativistic Schrödinger equation. It is a manifestly covariant equation, but at the same time its three-dimensional structure is evident. The four-vectors $p_{\perp }^{\mu }$ and $x_{\perp }^{\mu }$ have only three independent components since
$$P\cdot p_{\perp }=P\cdot x_{\perp }=0\,.$$
The similarity to the three-dimensional structure of the nonrelativistic Schrödinger equation can be made more explicit by writing the equation in the c.m. frame in which
$$P =(w,\vec{0}),$$
$$p_{\perp } =(0,\vec{p}),$$
$$x_{\perp } =(0,\vec{x}).$$

Comparison of the resultant form

| $\{\vec{p}^2+\Phi (\vec{x})\}\Psi =b^2(w^2,m_1^2,m_2^2)\Psi \,,$ | 10 |

with the time independent Schrödinger equation

| $\left( \vec{p}^2+2\mu V(\vec{x})\right) \Psi =2\mu E\Psi \,,$ | 11 |

makes this similarity explicit.

== The two-body relativistic Klein–Gordon equations ==
A plausible structure for the quasipotential $\Phi$ can be found by observing that the one-body Klein–Gordon equation $(p^2+m^2)\psi =(\vec{p}^2-\varepsilon ^2+m^2)\psi =0$ takes the form $(\vec{p}^2-\varepsilon ^2+m^2+2mS+S^2+2\varepsilon A-A^2)\psi =0~$ when one introduces a scalar interaction and timelike vector interaction via $m\rightarrow m+S~$and $\varepsilon \rightarrow \varepsilon -A$. In the two-body case, separate classical and quantum field theory arguments show that when one includes world scalar and vector interactions then $\Phi$ depends on two underlying invariant functions $S(r)$ and $A(r)$ through the two-body Klein–Gordon-like potential form with the same general structure, that is
$$\Phi =2m_{w}S+S^2+2\varepsilon _{w}A-A^2.$$
Those field theories further yield the c.m. energy dependent forms
$$m_{w}=m_1m_2/w,$$
and
$$\varepsilon _{w}=(w^2-m_1^2-m_2^2)/2w,$$
ones that Tododov introduced as the relativistic reduced mass and effective particle energy for a two-body system. Similar to what happens in the nonrelativistic two-body problem, in the relativistic case we have the motion of this effective particle taking place as if it were in an external field (here generated by $S$ and $A$). The two kinematical variables $m_{w}$ and $\varepsilon _{w}$ are related to one another by the Einstein condition
$$\varepsilon _{w}^2-m_{w}^2=b^2(w),$$
If one introduces the four-vectors, including a vector interaction $A^{\mu }$
$$\mathfrak{p} =\varepsilon _{w}\hat{P}+p,$$
$$A^{\mu } =\hat{P}^{\mu }A(r)$$
$$r =\sqrt{x_{\perp }^2}\,,$$
and scalar interaction $S(r)$, then the following classical minimal constraint form
$$\mathcal{H} = \left( \mathfrak{p-}A\right) ^2+(m_{w}+S)^2\approx 0\,,$$
reproduces

| $\mathcal{H} = p_{\perp }^2+\Phi -b^2\approx 0\,.$ | 12 |

Notice, that the interaction in this "reduced particle" constraint depends on two invariant scalars, $A(r)$ and $S(r)$, one guiding the time-like vector interaction and one the scalar interaction.

Is there a set of two-body Klein–Gordon equations analogous to the two-body Dirac equations? The classical relativistic constraints analogous to the quantum two-body Dirac equations (discussed in the introduction) and that have the same structure as the above Klein–Gordon one-body form are
$$\mathcal{H}_1=(p_1-A_1)^2+(m_1+S_1)^2=p_1^2+m_1^2+\Phi _1\approx 0$$
$$\mathcal{H}_2=(p_1-A_2)^2+(m_2+S_2)^2=p_2^2+m_2^2+\Phi _2\approx 0,$$
$$p_1 =\varepsilon _1\hat{P}+p;~~p_2=\varepsilon _2\hat{P}-p~.$$
Defining structures that display time-like vector and scalar interactions
$$\pi _1 =p_1-A_1=[\hat{P}(\varepsilon _1-\mathcal{A}_1)+p],$$
$$\pi _2 =p_2-A_2=[\hat{P}(\varepsilon _2-\mathcal{A}_1)-p],$$
$$M_1 =m_1+S_1,$$
$$M_2 =m_2+S_2,$$
gives
$$\mathcal{H}_1 =\pi _1^2+M_1^2,$$
$$\mathcal{H}_2 =\pi _2^2+M_2^2.$$
Imposing
$$\begin{align}
\Phi _1 & =\Phi _2\equiv \Phi (x_{\perp }) \\
& =-2p_1\cdot A_1+A_1^2+2m_1S_1+S_1^2 \\
& =-2p_2\cdot A_2+A_2^2+2m_2S_2+S_2^2 \\
& =2\varepsilon _{w}A-A^2+2m_{w}S+S^2,
\end{align}$$
and using the constraint $P\cdot p\approx 0$, reproduces Eqs.(12) provided

$$\pi _1^2-p^2 =-\left( \varepsilon _1-\mathcal{A}_1\right)^2=-\varepsilon _1^2+2\varepsilon _{w}A-A^2,$$

$$\pi _2^2-p^2 =-\left( \varepsilon _2-\mathcal{A}_2\right)^2=-\varepsilon _2^2+2\varepsilon _{w}A-A^2,$$
$$M_1{}^2 =m_1^2+2m_{w}S+S^2,$$
$$M_2^2 =m_2^2+2m_{w}S+S^2.$$
The corresponding Klein–Gordon equations are
$$\left( \pi _1^2+M_1^2\right) \psi = 0,$$
$$\left( \pi _2^2+M_2^2\right) \psi = 0,$$
and each, due to the constraint $P\cdot p\approx 0,$ is equivalent to
$$\mathcal{H}\psi =\left( p_{\perp }^2+\Phi -b^2\right) \psi = 0.$$

== Hyperbolic versus external field form of the two-body Dirac equations ==
For the two body system there are numerous covariant forms of interaction. The simplest way of looking at these is from the point of view of the gamma matrix structures of the corresponding interaction vertices of the single particle exchange diagrams. For scalar, pseudoscalar, vector, pseudovector, and tensor exchanges those matrix structures are respectively
$$1_11_2; \gamma _{51}\gamma _{52}; \gamma _1^{\mu }\gamma _{2\mu};
\gamma _{51}\gamma _1^{\mu }\gamma _{52}\gamma _{2\mu }; \sigma _{1\mu\nu } \sigma _2^{\mu \nu },$$
in which
$$\sigma _{i\mu \nu }=\frac{1}{2i}[\gamma _{i\mu },\gamma _{i\nu }]; i=1,2.$$
The form of the Two-Body Dirac equations which most readily incorporates each or any number of these intereractions in concert is the so-called hyperbolic form of the TBDE. For combined scalar and vector interactions those forms ultimately reduce to the ones given in the first set of equations of this article. Those equations are called the external field-like forms because their appearances are individually the same as those for the usual one-body Dirac equation in the presence of external vector and scalar fields.

The most general hyperbolic form for compatible TBDE is
$$\mathcal{S}_1\psi =(\cosh (\Delta )\mathbf{S}_1 + \sinh (\Delta ) \mathbf{S}_2)\psi = 0 ,$$

| $\mathcal{S}_2\psi =(\cosh (\Delta )\mathbf{S}_2+\sinh (\Delta ) \mathbf{S}_1)\psi =0,$ | 13 |

where $\Delta$ represents any invariant interaction singly or in combination. It has a matrix structure in addition to coordinate dependence. Depending on what that matrix structure is one has either scalar, pseudoscalar, vector, pseudovector, or tensor interactions. The operators $\mathbf{S}_1$ and $\mathbf{S}_2$ are auxiliary constraints satisfying
$$\mathbf{S}_1\psi \equiv (\mathcal{S}_{10}\cosh (\Delta )+\mathcal{S}
_{20}\sinh (\Delta )~)\psi =0,$$

| $\mathbf{S}_2\psi \equiv (\mathcal{S}_{20}\cosh (\Delta )+\mathcal{S} _{10}\sinh (\Delta )~)\psi =0,$ | 14 |

in which the $\mathcal{S}_{i0}$ are the free Dirac operators

| $\mathcal{S}_{i0}=\frac{i}{\sqrt{2}}\gamma _{5i}(\gamma _{i}\cdot p_{i}+m_{i})=0,$ | 15 |

This, in turn leads to the two compatibility conditions
$$\lbrack \mathcal{S}_1,\mathcal{S}_2]\psi =0,$$
and
$$\lbrack \mathbf{S}_1,\mathbf{S}_2]\psi =0,$$
provided that $\Delta =\Delta (x_{\perp }).$ These compatibility conditions do not restrict the gamma matrix structure of $\Delta$. That matrix structure is determined by the type of vertex-vertex structure incorporated in the interaction. For the two types of invariant interactions $\Delta$ emphasized in this article they are
$$\Delta _{\mathcal{L}}(x_{\perp }) =-1_11_2\frac{\mathcal{L}(x_{\perp })
}{2}\mathcal{O}_1,\text{scalar},$$
$$\Delta _{\mathcal{G}}(x_{\perp }) =\gamma_1\cdot \gamma_2\frac{\mathcal{G}(x_{\perp })}{2} \mathcal{O}_1,\text{vector} ,$$
$$\mathcal{O}_1=-\gamma _{51}\gamma _{52}.$$

For general independent scalar and vector interactions
$$\Delta (x_{\perp })=\Delta _{\mathcal{L}}+\Delta _{\mathcal{G}}.$$
The vector interaction specified by the above matrix structure for an electromagnetic-like interaction would correspond to the Feynman gauge.

If one inserts Eq.(14) into (13) and brings the free Dirac operator (15) to the right of the matrix hyperbolic functions and uses standard gamma matrix commutators and anticommutators and $\cosh^2\Delta -\sinh ^2\Delta =1$ one arrives at $\left( \partial _{\mu }=\partial /\partial x^{\mu }\right) ,$
$$\big(G\gamma _1\cdot \mathcal{P}_2-E_1\beta _1+M_1-G\frac{i}{2}\Sigma _2\cdot \partial (\mathcal{L}\beta _2 - \mathcal{G}\beta_1)\gamma _{52}\big)\psi =0,$$

| $\big(-G\gamma _2\cdot \mathcal{P}_1-E_2\beta _2+M_2+G\frac{i}{2} \Sigma _1\cdot \partial (\mathcal{L}\beta _1 - \mathcal{G}\beta_2)\gamma _{51}\big)\psi =0,$ | 16 |

in which
$$G = \exp \mathcal{G},$$
$$\beta _{i} = -\gamma _{i}\cdot \hat{P},$$
$$\gamma _{i\perp }^{\mu } =(\eta ^{\mu \nu }+\hat{P}^{\mu }\hat{P}^{\nu}) \gamma _{\nu i},$$
$$\Sigma _{i} =\gamma _{5i}\beta _{i}\gamma _{\perp i},$$
$$\mathcal{P}_{i} \equiv p_{\perp }-\frac{i}{2}\Sigma _{i}\cdot \partial \mathcal{G}\Sigma _{i} \,, \quad i=1,2.$$
The (covariant) structure of these equations are analogous to those of a Dirac equation for each of the two particles, with $M_{i}$ and $E_{i}$ playing the roles that $m+S$ and $\varepsilon -A$ do in the single particle Dirac equation
$$(\mathbf{\gamma }\cdot \mathbf{p-}\beta (\varepsilon -A)+m+S)\psi =0.$$
Over and above the usual kinetic part $\gamma _1\cdot p_{\perp }$ and time-like vector and scalar potential portions, the spin-dependent modifications involving $\Sigma _{i}\cdot \partial \mathcal{G}\Sigma _{i}$ and the last set of derivative terms are two-body recoil effects absent for the one-body Dirac equation but essential for the compatibility (consistency) of the two-body equations. The connections between what are designated as the vertex invariants $\mathcal{L},\mathcal{G}$ and the mass and energy potentials $M_{i},E_{i}$ are
$$M_1 = m_1 \cosh \mathcal{L} +m_2\sinh \mathcal{L},$$
$$M_2 =m_2 \cosh \mathcal{L} +m_1 \sinh \mathcal{L},$$
$$E_1 =\varepsilon _1 \cosh \mathcal{G} -\varepsilon _2\sinh \mathcal{G},$$
$$E_2 =\varepsilon _2 \cosh \mathcal{G}-\varepsilon _1\sinh \mathcal{G}.$$
Comparing Eq.(16) with the first equation of this article one finds that the spin-dependent vector interactions are
$$\tilde{A}_1^{\mu } =\big((\varepsilon _1-E_1)\big )\hat{P}^{\mu}+(1-G)p_{\perp }^{\mu } - \frac{i}{2} \partial G\cdot \gamma _2\gamma_2^{\mu },$$
$$A_2^{\mu } =\big((\varepsilon _2-E_2)\big )\hat{P}^{\mu}-(1-G)p_{\perp }^{\mu }+\frac{i}{2}\partial G\cdot \gamma _1\gamma_1^{\mu },$$
Note that the first portion of the vector potentials is timelike (parallel to $\hat{P}^{\mu })$ while the next portion is spacelike (perpendicular to $\hat{P}^{\mu })$. The spin-dependent scalar potentials $\tilde{S}_{i}$ are
$$\tilde{S}_1 = M_1 - m_1 - \frac{i}{2} G\gamma _2 \cdot \partial \mathcal{L},$$
$$\tilde{S}_2 = M_2 - m_2 + \frac{i}{2} G\gamma _1 \cdot \partial \mathcal{L}.$$

The parametrization for $\mathcal{L}$ and $\mathcal{G}$ takes advantage of the Todorov effective external potential forms (as seen in the above section on the two-body Klein Gordon equations) and at the same time displays the correct static limit form for the Pauli reduction to Schrödinger-like form. The choice for these parameterizations (as with the two-body Klein Gordon equations) is closely tied to classical or quantum field theories for separate scalar and vector interactions. This amounts to working in the Feynman gauge with the simplest relation between space- and timelike parts of the vector interaction. The mass and energy potentials are respectively
$$M_{i}^2 = m_{i}^2+\exp (2\mathcal{G})(2m_{w}S+S^2),$$
$$E_{i}^2 = \exp (2\mathcal{G}(A)) \left(\varepsilon _{i}-A\right)^2,$$
so that
$$\exp \mathcal{L} = \exp (\mathcal{L}(S,A)) = \frac{M_1+M_2}{m_1+m_2},$$
$$G = \exp \mathcal{G} = \exp (\mathcal{G}(A)) = \sqrt{\frac{1}{(1-2A/w)}}.$$

== Applications and limitations ==
The TBDE can be readily applied to two body systems such as positronium, muonium, hydrogen-like atoms, quarkonium, and the two-nucleon system. These applications involve two particles only and do not involve creation or annihilation of particles beyond the two. They involve only elastic processes. Because of the connection between the potentials used in the TBDE and the corresponding quantum field theory, any radiative correction to the lowest order interaction can be incorporated into those potentials. To see how this comes about, consider by contrast how one computes scattering amplitudes without quantum field theory. With no quantum field theory one must come upon potentials by classical arguments or phenomenological considerations. Once one has the potential $V$ between two particles, then one can compute the scattering amplitude $T$ from the Lippmann–Schwinger equation
$$T + V + VGT = 0,$$
in which $G$ is a Green function determined from the Schrödinger equation. Because of the similarity between the Schrödinger equation Eq. (11) and the relativistic constraint equation (10), one can derive the same type of equation as the above
$$\mathcal{T} + \Phi + \Phi \mathcal{G} \mathcal{T} = 0,$$
called the quasipotential equation with a $\mathcal{G}$ very similar to that given in the Lippmann–Schwinger equation. The difference is that with the quasipotential equation, one starts with the scattering amplitudes $\mathcal{T}$ of quantum field theory, as determined from Feynman diagrams and deduces the quasipotential Φ perturbatively. Then one can use that Φ in (10), to compute energy levels of two particle systems that are implied by the field theory. Constraint dynamics provides one of many, in fact an infinite number of, different types of quasipotential equations (three-dimensional truncations of the Bethe–Salpeter equation) differing from one another by the choice of $\mathcal{G}$. The relatively simple solution to the problem of relative time and energy from the generalized mass shell constraint for two particles, has no simple extension, such as presented here with the $x_{\perp}$ variable, to either two particles in an external field or to 3 or more particles. Sazdjian has presented a recipe for this extension when the particles are confined and cannot split into clusters of a smaller number of particles with no inter-cluster interactions Lusanna has developed an approach, one that does not involve generalized mass shell constraints with no such restrictions, which extends to N bodies with or without fields. It is formulated on spacelike hypersurfaces and when restricted to the family of hyperplanes orthogonal to the total timelike momentum gives rise to a covariant intrinsic 1-time formulation (with no relative time variables) called the "rest-frame instant form" of dynamics,

== See also ==
- Breit equation
- 4-vector
- Dirac equation
- Dirac equation in the algebra of physical space
- Dirac operator
- Electromagnetism
- Kinetic momentum
- Many body problem
- Invariant mass
- Particle physics
- Positronium
- Ricci calculus
- Special relativity
- Spin
- Quantum entanglement
- Relativistic quantum mechanics
