= Positronium hydride =

Exotic molecule consisting of a hydrogen atom bound to a positronium atom

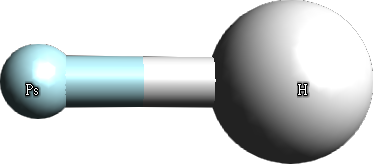

Names
- IUPAC name Positronium hydride

Identifiers
3D model (JSmol)	Interactive image
ChEBI	CHEBI:46711
- SMILES: [Ps][H]

Properties
Chemical formula	PsH
Molar mass	1.00794 g⋅mol^{−1}

Structure
Molecular shape	Diatomic molecule
- Except where otherwise noted, data are given for materials in their standard state (at 25 °C [77 °F], 100 kPa). Infobox references

Positronium hydride, or hydrogen positride is an exotic molecule consisting of a hydrogen atom bound to an exotic atom of positronium (the combination of an electron and a positron). Its formula is PsH. It was predicted to exist in 1951 by A. Ore, and subsequently studied theoretically, but was not observed until 1990. R. Pareja, R. Gonzalez from Madrid trapped positronium in hydrogen-laden magnesia crystals. The trap was prepared by Yok Chen from the Oak Ridge National Laboratory. In this experiment the positrons were thermalized so that they were not traveling at high speed, and they then reacted with H^{−} ions in the crystal. In 1992 it was created in an experiment done by David M. Schrader and F.M. Jacobsen and others at the Aarhus University in Denmark. The researchers made the positronium hydride molecules by firing intense bursts of positrons into methane, which has the highest density of hydrogen atoms. Upon slowing down, the positrons were captured by ordinary electrons to form positronium atoms which then reacted with hydrogen atoms from the methane.

== Decay ==
PsH is constructed from one proton, two electrons, and one positron. The binding energy is 1.1±0.2 eV. The lifetime of the molecule is 0.65 nanoseconds. The lifetime of positronium deuteride (PsD molecule made up of one deuterium atom and positronium) is indistinguishable from the normal hydride.

The decay of positronium is easily observed by detecting the two 511 keV gamma ray photons emitted in the decay. The energy of the photons from positronium should differ slightly by the binding energy of the molecule. However, this has not yet been detected.

== Properties ==
The structure of PsH is as a diatomic molecule, with a chemical bond between the two positively charged centres. The electrons are more concentrated around the proton. Predicting the properties of PsH is a four-body Coulomb problem. Calculated using the stochastic variational method, the size of the molecule is larger than dihydrogen, which has a bond length of 0.7413 Å. In PsH the positron and proton are separated on average by 3.66 a_{0} (1.94 Å). The positronium in the molecule is swollen compared to the positronium atom, increasing to 3.48 a_{0} compared to 3 a_{0}. Average distance of the electrons from the proton is larger than the dihydrogen molecule, at 2.31 a_{0} with the maximum density at 2.8 a_{0}.

== Formation ==
Due to its short lifetime, establishing the chemistry of positronium hydride poses difficulties. Theoretical calculations can predict outcomes. One method of formation is through alkali metal hydrides reacting with positrons. Molecules with dipole moments greater than 1.625 D are predicted to attract and hold positrons in a bound state. Crawford's model predicts this positron capture. In the case of lithium hydride, sodium hydride and potassium hydride molecules, this adduct decomposes and positronium hydride and the alkali positive ion form.

M^{+}H^{−} + e^{+} → PsH + M^{+}

== Similar compounds ==
PsH is a simple exotic compound. Other compounds of positronium are possible by the reactions e^{+} + AB → PsA + B^{+}. Other substances that contain positronium are di-positronium and the ion Ps^{−} with two electrons. Molecules of Ps with normal matter include halides and cyanide.

Positronium antihydride (PsH̅) contains antihydrogen instead of hydrogen. It can be made as the anti-hydride ion (H̅^{+}) reacts with positronium (Ps)

H̅^{+} + Ps → PsH̅ + e^{+}

The GBAR experiment uses the similar reaction H̅ + Ps → H̅^{+} + e^{–} which cannot produce positronium antihydride, as there is too much energy left over for positronium antihydride to be stable.

== Extra reading ==
- Zhang, Yi; Yan, Guo-An (25 March 2024). "P-Wave Doubly Excited States of Positronium Hydride". International Journal of Theoretical Physics. 63 (3): 80. Bibcode:2024IJTP...63...80Z. doi:10.1007/s10773-024-05596-w.
- Masood, Iraj; Munir, S. Zayad; Aslam, M. Jamil (25 March 2024). "Contribution of various spin configurations to the radiationless decay of PsH". Physical Review A. 109 (3) 032820. Bibcode:2024PhRvA.109c2820M. doi:10.1103/PhysRevA.109.032820.
