= Janine Shertzer =

American computational physicist

Janine Shertzer (born 1956) is an American computational physicist known for her application of the finite element method to few-body systems in atomic physics. She is a distinguished professor of science at the College of the Holy Cross in Worcester, Massachusetts.

== Education and career ==
Shertzer graduated in 1978 from Loyola University Maryland with a double major in physics and English. After a year of study as University Fellow at Georgetown University, she earned a master's degree in physics in 1979 and Ph.D. in 1984, both from Brown University. Her doctoral supervisor at Brown was Frank S. Levin.

She joined the faculty of the College of the Holy Cross in 1984. She became full professor there in 2001, and was the Anthony and Renee Marlon Professor in the Sciences from 2004 to 2009. She has been Distinguished Professor of Science since 2010. She chaired the physics department from 1998 to 2004.

== Recognition ==
Shertzer was named a Fellow of the American Physical Society (APS) in 2005, after a nomination from the APS Topical Group on Few-Body Systems, "for her ground-breaking introduction of novel finite-element techniques in calculations of bound state and scattering properties of atomic and molecular systems".

The College of the Holy Cross gave her their 2015 Distinguished Teaching Award.
