= Jerome Isaac Friedman =

American physicist (born 1930)

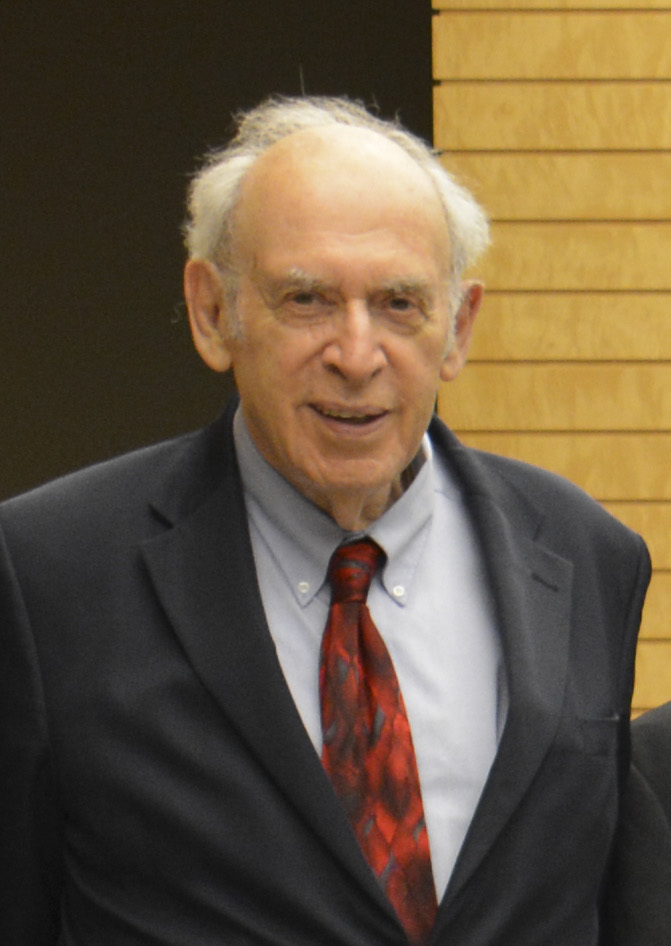
- Friedman in 2013
- Born: March 28, 1930 (age 96); Chicago, Illinois, U.S.
- Education: University of Chicago
- Known for: Experimental proof of quarks
- Spouse: Tania Letetsky-Baranovsky (m. 1956; 4 children)
- Awards: President's Medal of the IOP (2000); Nobel Prize in Physics (1990)
- Scientific career
- Fields: Physics
- Workplaces: MIT
- Doctoral advisor: Enrico Fermi

Jerome Isaac Friedman (born March 28, 1930) is an American physicist. He is institute professor and professor of physics, emeritus, at the Massachusetts Institute of Technology. He won the 1990 Nobel Prize in Physics along with Henry Kendall and Richard Taylor, "for their pioneering investigations concerning deep inelastic scattering of electrons on protons and bound neutrons, which have been of essential importance for the development of the quark model in particle physics.", work which showed an internal structure for protons later known to be quarks. Friedman sits on the board of sponsors of the Bulletin of the Atomic Scientists.

== Life and career ==
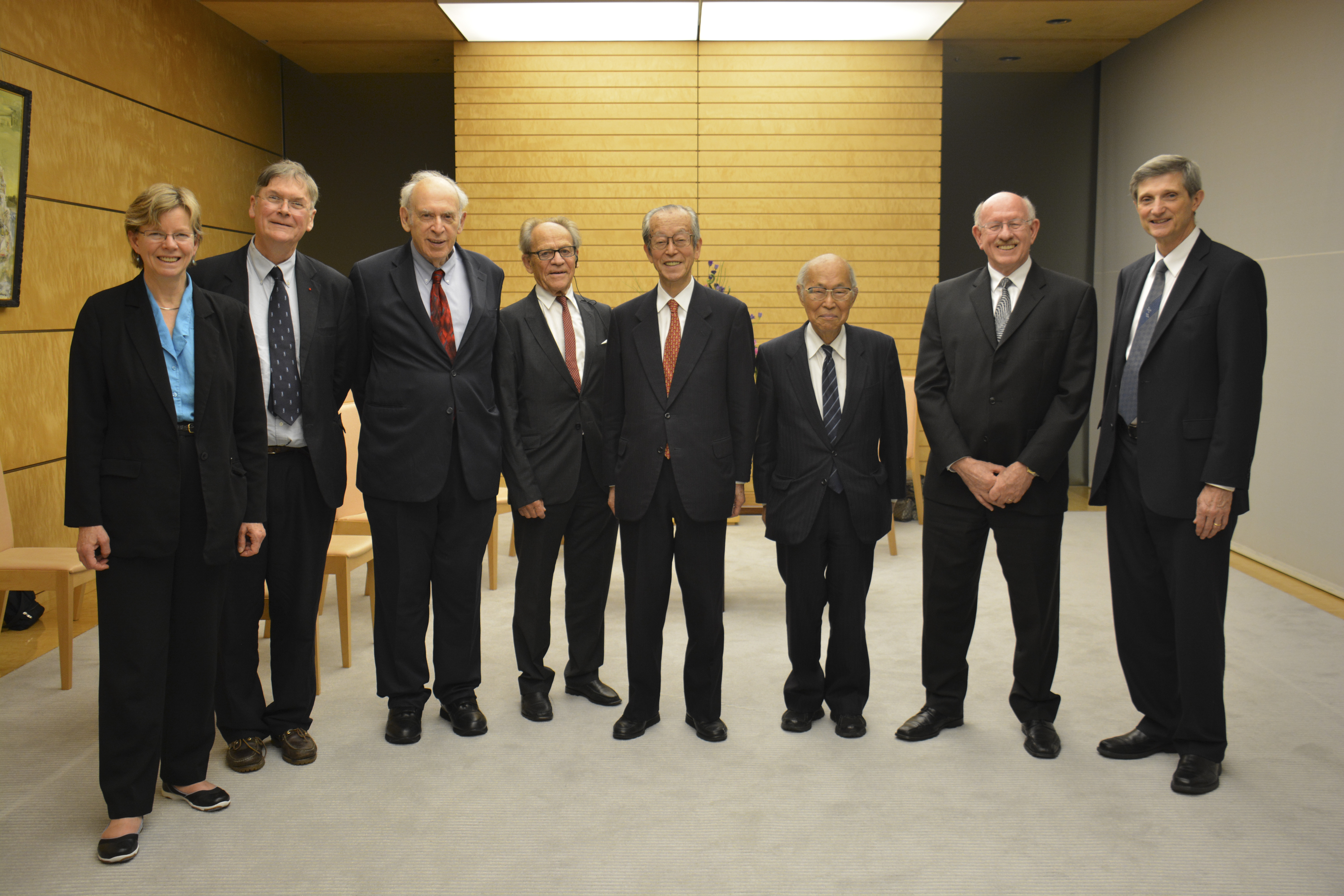
with Cherry A. Murray, Tim Hunt, Torsten Wiesel, Kōji Omi, Akito Arima, Jonathan M. Dorfan and Robert Baughman

Born in Chicago, Illinois to Lillian (née Warsaw) and Selig Friedman, a sewing machine salesman, Friedman's Jewish parents emigrated to the U.S. from Russia. Jerome Friedman excelled in art but became interested in physics after reading a book on relativity written by Albert Einstein. He turned down a scholarship to the Art Institute of Chicago in order to study physics at the University of Chicago. Whilst there he worked under Enrico Fermi, and eventually received his Ph.D. in physics in 1956. In 1960, he joined the physics faculty of the Massachusetts Institute of Technology.

In 1968–69, commuting between MIT and California, he conducted experiments with Henry W. Kendall and Richard E. Taylor at the Stanford Linear Accelerator Center which gave the first experimental evidence that protons had an internal structure, later known to be quarks. For this, Friedman, Kendall and Taylor shared the 1990 Nobel Prize in Physics. He is an institute professor at the Massachusetts Institute of Technology. Friedman is also a member of the board of sponsors of the Bulletin of the Atomic Scientists.

In 2003, he was one of 22 Nobel laureates who signed the Humanist Manifesto. He is an atheist.

Friedman is one of the 20 American recipients of the Nobel Prize in Physics to sign a letter addressed to President George W. Bush in May 2008, urging him to "reverse the damage done to basic science research in the Fiscal Year 2008 Omnibus Appropriations Bill" by requesting additional emergency funding for the Department of Energy’s Office of Science, the National Science Foundation, and the National Institute of Standards and Technology.

== Popular culture ==
Prof Friedman appeared on an episode of Da Ali G Show, where Sacha Baron Cohen interviews Jerome as a fictional character called Ali G.

== Publications ==
- Friedman, J. I., Kendall, H. W., et al. "Experimental Search for a Heavy Electron", Massachusetts Institute of Technology, United States Department of Energy (through predecessor agency the Atomic Energy Commission) September 1967.
- Friedman, J. I. "Deep Inelastic Electron Scattering: Experimental", Massachusetts Institute of Technology, United States Department of Energy (through predecessor agency the Atomic Energy Commission) October 1971.

== Honors ==
- Grand Cordon of the Order of the Rising Sun (2016)
- Member of the American Philosophical Society (2002)
- Member of the National Academy of Sciences (1992)
- Golden Plate Award of the American Academy of Achievement (1991)
- Member of the American Academy of Arts and Sciences (1980)

== See also ==
- List of Jewish Nobel laureates
