= Incomplete polylogarithm =

In mathematics, the incomplete polylogarithm function is related to the polylogarithm function. It is sometimes known as the incomplete Fermi–Dirac integral or the incomplete Bose–Einstein integral. It may be defined by:

$$\operatorname{Li}_s(b,z) = \frac{1}{\Gamma(s)}\int_b^\infty \frac{x^{s-1}}{e^{x}/z-1}~dx.$$

Expanding about z=0 and integrating gives a series representation:

$$\operatorname{Li}_s(b,z) = \sum_{k=1}^\infty \frac{z^k}{k^s}~\frac{\Gamma(s,kb)}{\Gamma(s)}$$

where Γ(s) is the gamma function and Γ(s,x) is the upper incomplete gamma function. Since Γ(s,0)=Γ(s), it follows that:

$$\operatorname{Li}_s(0,z) =\operatorname{Li}_s(z)$$

where Li_{s}(.) is the polylogarithm function.
