= Di-positronium =

Exotic molecule consisting of two atoms of positronium

Di-positronium, or dipositronium, is an exotic molecule consisting of two atoms of positronium. It was predicted to exist in 1946 by John Archibald Wheeler, and subsequently studied theoretically, but was not observed until 2007 in an experiment performed by David Cassidy and Allen Mills at the University of California, Riverside. The researchers made the positronium molecules by firing intense bursts of positrons into a thin film of porous silicon dioxide. Upon slowing down in the silica, the positrons captured ordinary electrons to form positronium atoms. Within the silica, these were long lived enough to interact, forming molecular di-positronium. Advances in trapping and manipulating positrons, and spectroscopy techniques have enabled studies of Ps–Ps interactions. In 2012, Cassidy et al. were able to produce the excited molecular positronium $L = 1$ angular momentum state.

== See also ==
- Hydrogen molecule
- Hydrogen molecular ion
- Positronium
- Positronium hydride
- Protonium
- Exotic atom
- Biexciton — solid-state analog
