= Dirac Medal =

The Dirac Medal or Dirac prize can refer to different awards named in honour of the physics Nobel Laureate Paul Dirac.

- Dirac Medal (ICTP), awarded by the Abdus Salam International Centre for Theoretical Physics, Trieste
- Dirac Medal (IOP), awarded by the Institute of Physics, UK
- Dirac Medal and Lecture, awarded jointly by Australian Institute of Physics and the University of New South Wales
- Dirac Medal (WATOC), awarded by World Association of Theoretical and Computational Chemists

== See also ==
- Paul Dirac § Legacy
- List of things named after Paul Dirac
- List of physics awards
- List of awards named after people
