= Fermi Paradox (disambiguation) =

The Fermi paradox, named after Italian-American physicist Enrico Fermi, is the apparent contradiction between the lack of evidence for extraterrestrial civilizations and various high estimates for their probability.

== Music ==
=== Albums ===
- Fermi Paradox (Tub Ring album), 2002
- Fermi Paradox (Ronn McFarlane & Carolyn Surrick album), 2020

=== Songs ===
- "Fermi Paradox", a 2011 song by Hank Green from Ellen Hardcastle
- "Fermi Paradox", a 2016 song by Avenged Sevenfold from The Stage

== Books ==
- The Fermi Paradox Is Our Business Model, a 2010 science fiction by Charlie Jane Anders
