= Breit equation =

Relativistic wave equation derived by Gregory Breit in 1929

The Breit equation, or Dirac–Coulomb–Breit equation, is a relativistic wave equation derived by Gregory Breit in 1929 based on the Dirac equation, which formally describes two or more massive spin-1/2 particles (electrons, for example) interacting electromagnetically to the first order in perturbation theory. It accounts for magnetic interactions and retardation effects to the order of 1/c^{2}. When other quantum electrodynamic effects are negligible, this equation has been shown to give results in good agreement with experiment. It was originally derived from the Darwin Lagrangian but later vindicated by the Wheeler–Feynman absorber theory and eventually quantum electrodynamics.

== Introduction ==
The Breit equation is not only an approximation in terms of quantum mechanics, but also in terms of relativity theory as it is not completely invariant with respect to the Lorentz transformation. Just as does the Dirac equation, it treats nuclei as point sources of an external field for the particles it describes. For N particles, the Breit equation has the form (r_{ij} is the distance between particle i and j):

$i\hbar\frac{\partial \Psi}{\partial t} = \left(\sum_{i}\hat{H}_{\rm D}(i) + \sum_{i>j}\frac{1}{r_{ij}} + \sum_{i>j}\hat{B}_{ij} \right) \Psi$

where
$$\hat{H}_\text{D}(i) = \left[ q_{i}\phi(\mathbf{r}_{i}) + c\sum_{s=x,y,z}\alpha_{s}(i)\pi_{s}(I) + \alpha_{0}(I) m_0 c^2 \right]$$
is the Dirac Hamiltonian (see Dirac equation) for particle i at position $\mathbf{r}_i$ and $\phi(\mathbf{r}_i)$ is the scalar potential at that position; q_{i} is the charge of the particle, thus for electrons q_{i} = −e. The one-electron Dirac Hamiltonians of the particles, along with their instantaneous Coulomb interactions 1/r_{ij}, form the Dirac–Coulomb operator. To this, Breit added the operator (now known as the (frequency-independent) Breit operator):
$$\hat{B}_{ij} = -\frac{1}{2r_{ij}} \left[ \vec{\alpha}(i)\cdot\vec{\alpha}(j) + \frac{ \left(\vec{\alpha}(i)\cdot\mathbf{r}_{ij}\right) \left(\vec{\alpha}(j)\cdot\mathbf{r}_{ij}\right) }{r_{ij}^2} \right],$$
where the Dirac matrices for electron i: α(i) = [α_{x}(i), α_{y}(i), α_{z}(i)]. The two terms in the Breit operator account for retardation effects to the first order. The wave function Ψ in the Breit equation is a spinor with 4^{N} elements, since each electron is described by a Dirac spinor with 4 elements as in the Dirac equation, and the total wave function is the tensor product of these.

== Breit Hamiltonians ==
The total Hamiltonian of the Breit equation, sometimes called the Dirac–Coulomb–Breit Hamiltonian (H_{DCB}) can be decomposed into the following practical energy operators for electrons in electric and magnetic fields (also called the Breit–Pauli Hamiltonian), which have well-defined meanings in the interaction of molecules with magnetic fields (for instance for nuclear magnetic resonance):
$$\hat{B}_{ij} = \hat{H}_{0} + \hat{H}_{1} + \dots + \hat{H}_{6} ,$$
in which the consecutive partial operators are:

- $\hat{H}_{0} = \sum_{i}\frac{\hat{p}_{i}^{2}}{2m_{i}} + V$ is the nonrelativistic Hamiltonian ($m_{i}$ is the stationary mass of particle i).
- $\hat{H}_{1} = -\frac{1}{8c^{2}}\sum_{i}\frac{\hat{p}_{i}^{4}}{m_{i}^{3}}$ is connected to the dependence of mass on velocity: $E_{\rm kin}^{2} - \left(m_0c^2\right)^2 = m^2v^2c^2$.
- $\hat{H}_{2} = - \sum_{i>j} \frac{q_iq_j}{2r_{ij}m_im_jc^2} \left[ \mathbf{\hat{p}}_i\cdot\mathbf{\hat{p}}_j + \frac{(\mathbf{r_{ij}}\cdot\mathbf{\hat{p}}_i)(\mathbf{r_{ij}}\cdot\mathbf{\hat{p}}_j)}{r_{ij}^2} \right]$ is a correction that partly accounts for retardation and can be described as the interaction between the magnetic dipole moments of the particles, which arise from the orbital motion of charges (also called orbit–orbit interaction).
- $\hat{H}_3 = \frac{\mu_{\rm B}}{c} \sum_i \frac{1}{m_i} \mathbf{s}_i\cdot\left[ \mathbf{F}(\mathbf{r}_i)\times\mathbf{\hat{p}}_i + \sum_{j > i} \frac{2q_i}{r_{ij}^3}\mathbf{r}_{ij}\times\mathbf{\hat{p}}_j \right]$ is the classical interaction between the orbital magnetic moments (from the orbital motion of charge) and spin magnetic moments (also called spin–orbit interaction). The first term describes the interaction of a particle's spin with its own orbital moment (F(r_{i}) is the electric field at the particle's position), and the second term between two different particles.
- $\hat{H}_4 = \frac{ih}{8 \pi c^2} \sum_{i} \frac{q_i}{m_i^2} \mathbf{\hat{p}}_i\cdot\mathbf{F}(\mathbf{r}_i)$ is a nonclassical term characteristic for Dirac theory, sometimes called the Darwin term.
- $\hat{H}_5 = 4\mu_{\rm B}^2 \sum_{i>j} \left\lbrace -\frac{8\pi}{3} (\mathbf{s}_i\cdot\mathbf{s}_j)\delta(\mathbf{r}_{ij}) + \frac{1}{r_{ij}^3}\left[ \mathbf{s}_i\cdot\mathbf{s}_j - \frac{3(\mathbf{s}_i\cdot\mathbf{r}_{ij})(\mathbf{s}_j\cdot\mathbf{r}_{ij})}{r_{ij}^2} \right] \right\rbrace$ is the magnetic moment spin-spin interaction. The first term is called the contact interaction, because it is nonzero only when the particles are at the same position; the second term is the interaction of the classical dipole-dipole type.
- $\hat{H}_6 = 2\mu_{\rm B} \sum_{i} \left[ \mathbf{H}(\mathbf{r}_i)\cdot\mathbf{s}_i + \frac{q_i}{m_ic}\mathbf{A}(\mathbf{r}_i)\cdot\mathbf{\hat{p}}_i \right]$ is the interaction between spin and orbital magnetic moments with an external magnetic field H.

where: $V= \sum_{i>j} \frac{q_i q_j}{r_{ij}}$ and $\mu_{\rm B} = \frac{e \hbar}{2 m c}$ is the Bohr magneton.

== See also ==
- Bethe–Salpeter equation
- Darwin Lagrangian
- Two-body Dirac equations
- Positronium
- Wheeler–Feynman absorber theory
