= Karnut =

Village in Shirak, Armenia

Karnut Կառնուտ
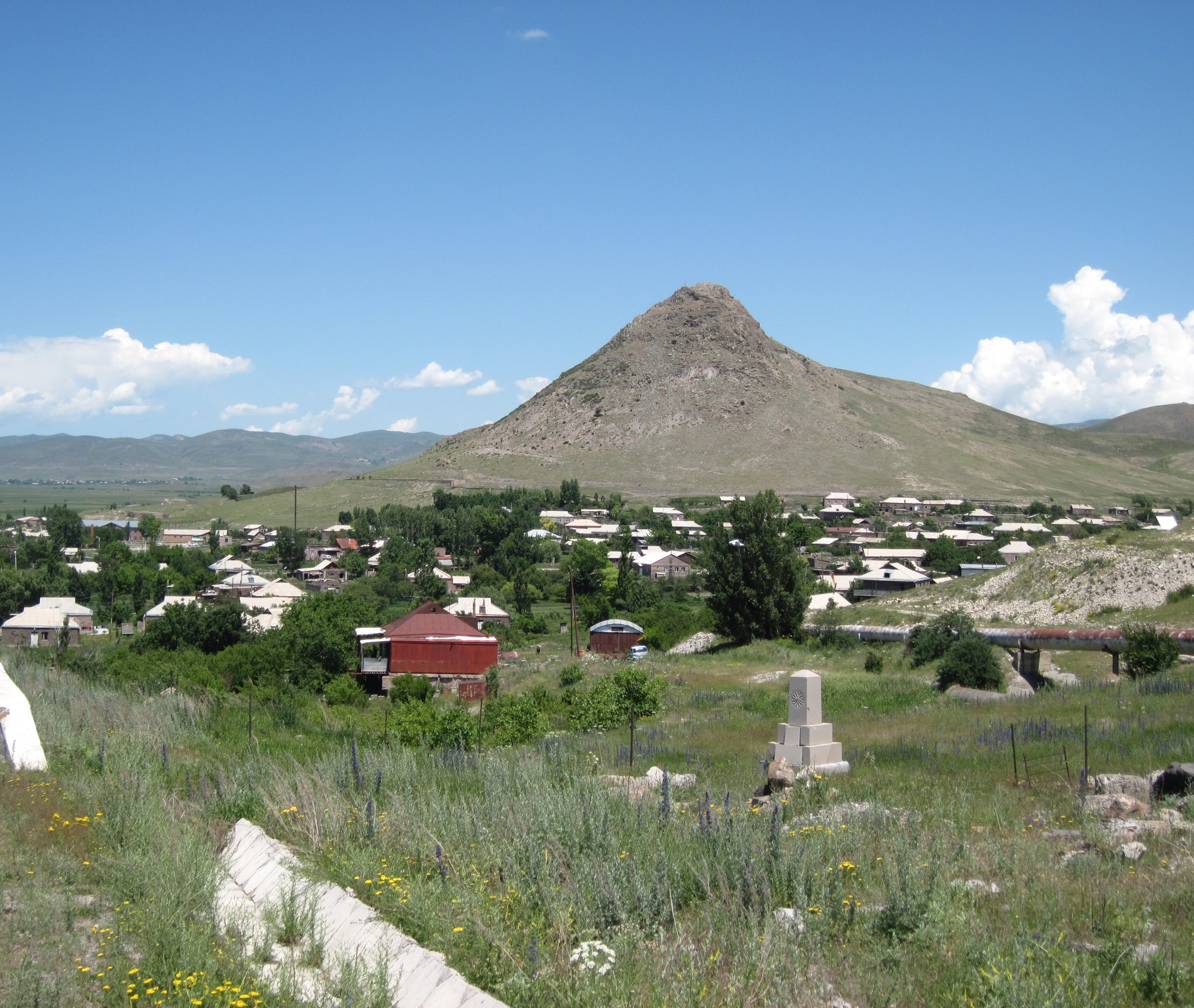

- Location within Armenia Location within Shirak
- Coordinates: 40°47′01″N 43°57′15″E
- Country: Armenia
- Province: Shirak
- Municipality: Akhuryan

Population (2011)
  - Total: 851
- Time zone: UTC+4
  - Summer (DST): UTC+5

Karnut (Armenian: Կառնուտ) is a village in the Akhuryan Municipality of the Shirak Province of Armenia.

== Demographics ==
The population of the village since 1831 is as follows:

Historical population
Year	Pop.	±% p.a.
1831	151	—
1897	965	+2.85%
1926	1,149	+0.60%
1939	1,136	−0.09%
1959	783	−1.84%
1970	719	−0.77%
1979	667	−0.83%
2001	992	+1.82%
2011	851	−1.52%
