= Complete Fermi–Dirac integral =

Mathematical integral

In mathematics, the complete Fermi–Dirac integral, named after Enrico Fermi and Paul Dirac, for an index j is defined by

$$F_j(x) = \frac{1}{\Gamma(j+1)} \int_0^\infty \frac{t^j}{e^{t-x} + 1}\,dt, \qquad (j > -1)$$

This equals

$$-\operatorname{Li}_{j+1}(-e^x),$$

where $\operatorname{Li}_{s}(z)$ is the polylogarithm.

Its derivative is

$$\frac{dF_{j}(x)}{dx} = F_{j-1}(x) ,$$

and this derivative relationship is used to define the Fermi-Dirac integral for nonpositive indices j. Differing notation for $F_j$ appears in the literature, for instance some authors omit the factor $1/\Gamma(j+1)$. The definition used here matches that in the NIST DLMF.

== Special values ==
The closed form of the function exists for j = 0:

$$F_0(x) = \ln(1+\exp(x)).$$

For x = 0, the result reduces to

$F_j(0) = \eta(j+1),$

where $\eta$ is the Dirichlet eta function.

== See also ==
- Incomplete Fermi–Dirac integral
- Gamma function
- Polylogarithm
- Fermi–Dirac statistics
