= Incomplete Fermi–Dirac integral =

In mathematics, the incomplete Fermi-Dirac integral, named after Enrico Fermi and Paul Dirac, for an index $j$ and parameter $b$ is given by

$$\operatorname{F}_j(x,b) \overset{\mathrm{def}}{=} \frac{1}{\Gamma(j+1)} \int_b^\infty\! \frac{t^j}{e^{t-x} + 1}\;\mathrm{d}t$$

Its derivative is

$$\frac{\mathrm{d}}{\mathrm{d}x}\operatorname{F}_j(x,b) =  \operatorname{F}_{j-1}(x,b)$$

and this derivative relationship may be used to find the value of the incomplete Fermi-Dirac integral for non-positive indices $j$.

This is an alternate definition of the incomplete polylogarithm, since:

$$\operatorname{F}_j(x,b) = \frac{1}{\Gamma(j+1)} \int_b^\infty\! \frac{t^j}{e^{t-x} + 1}\;\mathrm{d}t = \frac{1}{\Gamma(j+1)} \int_b^\infty\! \frac{t^j}{\displaystyle \frac{e^t}{e^x} + 1}\;\mathrm{d}t = -\frac{1}{\Gamma(j+1)} \int_b^\infty\! \frac{t^j}{\displaystyle \frac{e^t}{-e^x} - 1}\;\mathrm{d}t = -\operatorname{Li}_{j+1}(b,-e^x)$$

Which can be used to prove the identity:

$$\operatorname{F}_j(x,b) = -\sum_{n=1}^\infty \frac{(-1)^n}{n^{j+1}}\frac{\Gamma(j+1,nb)}{\Gamma(j+1)}e^{nx}$$

where $\Gamma(s)$ is the gamma function and $\Gamma(s,y)$ is the upper incomplete gamma function. Since $\Gamma(s,0)=\Gamma(s)$, it follows that:

$$\operatorname{F}_j(x,0) = \operatorname{F}_j(x)$$

where $\operatorname{F}_j(x)$ is the complete Fermi-Dirac integral.

== Special values ==
The closed form of the function exists for $j=0$:

$$\operatorname{F}_0(x,b) = \ln\!\big(1+e^{x-b}\big) - (b - x)$$

== See also ==
- Complete Fermi–Dirac integral
- Fermi–Dirac statistics
- Incomplete polylogarithm
- Polylogarithm
