= List of things named after Stanislaw Ulam =

This is a (partial) list of things named after Stanislaw Ulam, a 20th-century Polish-American mathematician who also worked in physics and biological sciences:

== Computer science ==
- Stan, probabilistic programming language

== Mathematics ==
- Borsuk–Ulam theorem
- Erdős–Ulam problem
- Fermi–Pasta–Ulam–Tsingou problem
- Hyers–Ulam–Rassias stability
- Kuratowski–Ulam theorem
- Mazur–Ulam theorem
- Ulam's conjecture
  - Collatz conjecture
  - Kelly–Ulam conjecture, or reconstruction conjecture
  - Ulam's packing conjecture
- Ulam matrix
- Ulam numbers
- Ulam spiral
- Ulam's game
- Ulam–Warburton cellular automaton

== Physics ==
- Fermi–Pasta–Ulam–Tsingou problem
- Fermi–Ulam model
- Teller–Ulam design
