= List of things named after Enrico Fermi =

Enrico Fermi (1901–1954), an Italian-born, naturalized American physicist, is the eponym of the topics listed below.

== Physics ==
- Fermi (unit), unit of length in particle physics equivalent to the femtometre
- Fermi arc, a phenomenon in superconductivity
- Fermi constant, constant that gives the strength of Fermi's interaction
- Fermi contact interaction, the magnetic interaction between an electron and an atomic nucleus when the electron is inside that nucleus
- Fermi energy
- Fermi's four factor formula
- Fermi gas
- Fermi's interaction, an explanation of the beta decay
- Fermi level
- Fermi liquid theory
  - Quasi Fermi level, also called imref which is "fermi" spelt backwards
- Fermi heap and Fermi hole
- Fermi–Kurie plot of beta decay
- Fermi paradox, a fundamental issue in SETI
- Fermi point
- Fermi pseudopotential
- Fermi's golden rule
- Fermi motion, the quantum motion of nucleons bound inside a nucleus
- Fermi resonance
- Fermi surface
- Fermi acceleration
  - Fermi–Ulam model
  - Fermi–Pustyl'nikov model, a model of the Fermi acceleration mechanism
- Fermi glow
- Fermi ball
- Fermi sea
- Fermi transition
- Fermi–Walker transport
- Fermi–Dirac statistics
  - Fermi–Dirac condensate
- Fermion, the class of particles that obey Fermi-Dirac statistics, a name coined by Dirac in 1945
- Fermium, a synthetic element with symbol Fm and atomic number 100.
- Fermionic field
- Thomas–Fermi model approximation
- Thomas–Fermi model
  - Thomas–Fermi equation
- Thomas–Fermi screening, an approximate method for describing screening of electric field by mobile charge

== Mathematics ==
- Complete Fermi–Dirac integral
- Incomplete Fermi–Dirac integral
- Fermi–Walker differentiation
- Fermi coordinates, local coordinates that are adapted to a geodesic in Riemannian geometry
- Fermi–Pasta–Ulam–Tsingou problem
- Fermi problem, estimation problem designed to teach dimensional analysis, and approximation
- Fermi paradox, typical example of a Fermi problem pertaining to extraterrestrial civilizations

== Research ==
- Fermilab, Fermi National Accelerator Laboratory
- Enrico Fermi Institute, Chicago, Illinois
- FeRMI, a research federation in Toulouse, France
- Fermi Avenue, Harwell Campus

== Technology ==
- Fermi Explorer proposed first interstellar spacecraft
- The Fermi microarchitecture developed by Nvidia, which powered the GeForce 400 and GeForce 500 series
- Fermi Gamma-ray Space Telescope
- Enrico Fermi Nuclear Generating Station, Monroe, Michigan
- Enrico Fermi Nuclear Power Plant (Italy), Trino Vercellese, Italy
- RA-1 Enrico Fermi, Argentinian research reactor
- FERMIAC
- Fermi filter
- Fermi Linux, distributions produced Fermilab
- Fermi-Szilárd Neutronic Reactor, US patent 2,708,656

== Other ==
- Enrico Fermi Award
- Enrico Fermi Prize
- Enrico Fermi Professorship in Physics at Columbia University
- Fermi Paradox (album), an album by Tub Ring
- Fermi Paradox, a song by Avenged Sevenfold
- Fermi Project, a philanthropic organization
- Fermi, a large lunar crater
- Fermi and Frost, a science fiction short story by Frederik Pohl with themes including the Fermi paradox
- The Fermi Paradox Is Our Business Model, a science fiction short story by Charlie Jane Anders
- 8103 Fermi (1994 BE), a main-belt asteroid
- Fermi, a metro station in Turin
- EUR Fermi, a station of the Rome Metro
- Enrico Fermi High School, a high school located in Enfield, Connecticut
- Instituto Italiano Enrico Fermi in Panama.
- Schools, squares and streets in almost all Italian towns and villages
- The Fermi's, a play about Enrico & Laura Fermi set on the last day of his life.
- Enrico Fermi School-Yonkers, NY
- International School of Physics "Enrico Fermi", an annual summer school hosted by the Italian Physical Society
