= Rassias =

Rassias is a surname. Notable people with the surname and uses of the name include:

- John Rassias (1925-2015), American language-teaching pioneer

- Dartmouth College's Rassias Center for World Languages and Cultures which he founded

- Themistocles M. Rassias (born 1951), Greek mathematician

- Aleksandrov–Rassias problem
- Cauchy–Rassias stability
- Hyers–Ulam–Rassias stability

- Vlassis G. Rassias (1959–2019), Greek writer and neopagan leader
