= Cauchy–Rassias stability =

A classical problem of Stanislaw Ulam in the theory of functional equations is the following: When is it true that a function which approximately satisfies a functional equation E must be close to an exact solution of E? In 1941, Donald H. Hyers gave a partial affirmative answer to this question in the context of Banach spaces. This was the first significant breakthrough and a step towards more studies in this domain of research. Since then, a large number of papers have been published in connection with various generalizations of Ulam's problem and Hyers' theorem. In 1978, Themistocles M. Rassias succeeded in extending the Hyers' theorem by considering an unbounded Cauchy difference. He was the first to prove the stability of the linear mapping in Banach spaces. In 1950, T. Aoki had provided a proof of a special case of the Rassias' result when the given function is additive. For an extensive presentation of the stability of functional equations in the context of Ulam's problem, the interested reader is referred to the recent book of S.-M. Jung, published by Springer, New York, 2011 (see references below).

Th. M. Rassias' theorem attracted a number of mathematicians who began to be stimulated to do research in stability theory of functional equations. By regarding the large influence of S. M. Ulam, D. H. Hyers and Th. M. Rassias on the study of stability problems of functional equations, this concept is called the Hyers–Ulam–Rassias stability.

In the special case when Ulam's problem accepts a solution for Cauchy's functional equation f(x + y) = f(x) + f(y), the equation E is said to satisfy the Cauchy–Rassias stability. The name is referred to Augustin-Louis Cauchy and Themistocles M. Rassias.
