= Banach–Stone theorem =

An important question in mathematics is whether a space can be completely described by the functions defined on it—that is, by its "observables." The Banach–Stone theorem is a classical result in this direction. It shows that certain well-behaved spaces (specifically, compact Hausdorff spaces) can be recovered from the Banach space of continuous functions defined on them. The theorem is named after the mathematicians Stefan Banach and Marshall Stone.

In brief, the Banach–Stone theorem allows one to recover a compact Hausdorff space X from the Banach space structure of the space C(X) of continuous real- or complex-valued functions on X. If one is allowed to invoke the algebra structure of C(X) then recovering X is easy – we can identify X with the spectrum of C(X), the set of algebra homomorphisms into the field of scalars, equipped with the weak*-topology inherited from the dual space C(X)*. What makes the Banach–Stone theorem striking is that it avoids reference to multiplicative structure by recovering X from the extreme points of the unit ball of C(X)*.

Thus the Banach–Stone theorem states that if C(X) and C(Y) are isometrically isomorphic as Banach spaces, then X and Y are homeomorphic.

== Statement ==
For a compact Hausdorff space X, let C(X) denote the Banach space of continuous real- or complex-valued functions on X, equipped with the supremum norm ‖·‖_{∞}.

Given compact Hausdorff spaces X and Y, suppose T : C(X) → C(Y) is a surjective linear isometry. Then there exists a homeomorphism φ : Y → X and a function g ∈ C(Y) with

$$| g(y) | = 1 \mbox{ for all } y \in Y$$

such that

$$(T f) (y) = g(y) f(\varphi(y)) \mbox{ for all } y \in Y, f \in C(X).$$

The case where X and Y are compact metric spaces is due to Banach, while the extension to compact Hausdorff spaces is due to Stone. In fact, they both prove a slight generalization—they do not assume that T is linear, only that it is an isometry in the sense of metric spaces, and use the Mazur–Ulam theorem to show that T is affine, and so $T - T(0)$ is a linear isometry.

== Generalizations ==
The Banach–Stone theorem has some generalizations for vector-valued continuous functions on compact, Hausdorff topological spaces. For example, if E is a Banach space with trivial centralizer and X and Y are compact, then every linear isometry of C(X; E) onto C(Y; E) is a strong Banach–Stone map.

A similar technique has also been used to recover a space X from the extreme points of the duals of some other spaces of functions on X.

The noncommutative analog of the Banach-Stone theorem is the folklore theorem that two unital C*-algebras are isomorphic if and only if they are completely isometric (i.e., isometric at all matrix levels). Mere isometry is not enough, as shown by the existence of a C*-algebra that is not isomorphic to its opposite algebra (which trivially has the same Banach space structure).

== See also ==
- Banach space – Normed vector space that is complete
