= Luis Arroyo Zapatero =

Spanish criminal-law scholar and university rector

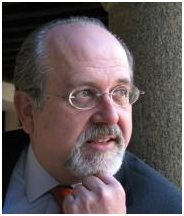
- Born: 1951 (age 74–75); Valladolid, Spain
- Citizenship: Spanish

Academic background
- Education: University of Valladolid; University of Cologne; Complutense University of Madrid (PhD)

Academic work
- Discipline: Criminal law
- Sub-discipline: Labour criminal law, European criminal law and comparative criminal law
- Institutions: Complutense University of Madrid; University of Castilla–La Mancha
- Main interests: Criminal responsibility, international harmonisation of criminal law and abolition of capital punishment

Luis Arroyo Zapatero (born 1951) is a Spanish legal scholar and academic administrator. He is professor emeritus of criminal law at the University of Castilla–La Mancha (UCLM), where he served as the first elected rector from 1988 to 2003 and later became honorary rector. He founded the university's Institute of European and International Criminal Law and directed it until 2022. Since 2002, he has been president of the International Society of Social Defence.

Arroyo Zapatero was elected a corresponding member of the Académie des Sciences Morales et Politiques of the Institut de France in 2019.

== Education and academic career ==
Born in Valladolid, Arroyo Zapatero studied law at the University of Valladolid. From 1975 to 1977 he pursued doctoral studies at the University of Cologne with a scholarship from the German Academic Exchange Service. He received his doctorate in law from the Complutense University of Madrid in 1980. His thesis examined criminal responsibility in occupational accidents.

He taught criminal law at the Complutense University of Madrid in the early 1980s. In 1985 he joined the newly established law faculty of the University of Castilla–La Mancha in Albacete and became its founding dean. He was elected rector of the university in 1988 and was re-elected in 1991, 1995 and 1999, remaining in office until 2003.

After his rectorate, he continued to develop the Institute of European and International Criminal Law, which he had founded at UCLM. He remained its director until a new director was appointed in June 2022.

== Research ==
Arroyo Zapatero's early research concerned criminal liability for workplace accidents, including offences committed by omission. He developed this subject in La protección penal de la seguridad en el trabajo (1981) and Manual de derecho penal del trabajo (1988), which examined the use of criminal law to protect workers' health and safety. His research later extended to economic criminal law and the relationship between criminal law, fundamental rights and the Spanish constitution.

Another strand of his work concerns comparative law, European criminal law and the international harmonisation of criminal legislation. He has examined the development of common standards through international organisations and the European Union, as well as the difficulties created by differences between national legal traditions. In articles published in French in 2011 and 2021, he discussed the role of comparative law in the formulation of international criminal policy.

The abolition of capital punishment is a prominent theme in his academic and public work. He has studied abolition in the context of international human-rights law and the legal and political factors that lead states to abandon the death penalty. In 2011 he spoke at the Collège de France on the abolition of capital punishment in international criminal law. His 2016 chapter “Les chemins de l'abolition de la peine de mort: Acteurs, facteurs et processus” examined the participants, legal instruments and political conditions involved in abolition.

== International roles and honours ==
Arroyo Zapatero has chaired the International Society of Social Defence since 2002. From 2006 to 2018 he served on the scientific advisory board of the institute now known as the Max Planck Institute for the Study of Crime, Security and Law, and was vice-chair of the board from 2009 to 2018. He has also held office in the International Association of Penal Law; in 2009 he was listed among the association's vice-presidents.

On 30 September 2019, the Académie des Sciences Morales et Politiques elected him a corresponding member in its Morals and Sociology section, succeeding Évelyne Sullerot.

He has received honorary doctorates from universities and institutes in Europe and Latin America, including the Federal University of the State of Rio de Janeiro (UNIRIO) in 2004, Valahia University of Târgoviște in 2009 and Mexico's National Institute of Criminal Sciences in 2016. His other distinctions include the Gold Medal of Castilla–La Mancha in 2006 and the Cross of Honour of Spain's Order of St Raymond of Peñafort in 2007.

== Selected works ==
- Arroyo Zapatero, Luis (1981). La protección penal de la seguridad en el trabajo (in Spanish). Madrid: Servicio Social de Higiene y Seguridad en el Trabajo.
- Arroyo Zapatero, Luis (1988). Manual de derecho penal del trabajo (in Spanish). Barcelona: Praxis. p. 365. ISBN 84-7197-141-0.
- Arroyo Zapatero, Luis (2008). "De la lutte contre l'esclavage et la traite des blanches à la proscription du trafic d'êtres humains". In Delmas-Marty, Mireille; Pieth, Mark; Sieber, Ulrich (eds.). Les chemins de l'harmonisation pénale: Harmonising criminal law (in French). Paris: Société de législation comparée. pp. 105–126. ISBN 978-2-908199-63-5.
- Arroyo Zapatero, Luis (2011). "L'harmonisation internationale du droit pénal". Revue de science criminelle et de droit pénal comparé (in French) (3). Translated by Tricot, Juliette: 557–574.
- Arroyo Zapatero, Luis (2016). "Les chemins de l'abolition de la peine de mort: Acteurs, facteurs et processus". In Crépon, Marc; Halpérin, Jean-Louis; Manacorda, Stefano (eds.). La Peine de mort: Vers l'abolition absolue ? (in French). Paris: Éditions Rue d'Ulm. pp. 69–80. ISBN 978-2-7288-0545-7.
- Arroyo Zapatero, Luis (2023). "Criminologie de la guerre et politique criminelle de l'Union européenne". Revue européenne du droit (in French) (5): 15–22. doi:10.3917/red.005.0015.
