= Ulam's conjecture =

Ulam's conjecture may refer to:

- Collatz conjecture, in number theory
- Reconstruction conjecture, in graph theory
- Ulam's packing conjecture, in geometry
