= 1234 (number) =

← 1233	1234	1235 →
- List of numbers; Integers; ← 0 1k 2k 3k 4k 5k 6k 7k 8k 9k →
- Cardinal: one thousand two hundred thirty-four
- Ordinal: 1234th (one thousand two hundred thirty-fourth)
- Factorization: 2 × 617
- Divisors: 1, 2, 617, 1234
- Greek numeral: ,ΑΣΛΔ´
- Roman numeral: MCCXXXIV, mccxxxiv
- Binary: 10011010010_{2}
- Ternary: 1200201_{3}
- Senary: 5414_{6}
- Octal: 2322_{8}
- Duodecimal: 86A_{12}
- Hexadecimal: 4D2_{16}

1234 (one thousand two hundred [and] thirty-four) is the natural number following 1233, and preceding 1235.

== In mathematics ==
=== Prime factorization ===
The prime factorizations of 1234 are 2 and 617. This means it generates the divisors of 1234, which are 1, 2, 617, and 1234. Since 1234 is the product of two distinct prime numbers, it is a semiprime, more specifically the 363rd such number.

=== Decimal properties ===
1234 is the smallest whole number that contains the digits from 1 through 4 in decimal. (Note: Ordered by standard statistical (or Yates) order, the digits "1234" form the fifteenth element in subsets of the natural numbers.) (Note: 1234 has a prime composite index of 1031, also the index of the fifth prime repunit (of just 1s) in base-ten, $R_{1031}$ (following $R_{2}$, $R_{19}$, $R_{23}$, and $R_{317}$).) The sum of the base-ten digits of 1234 forms the fourth triangular number, which is 10. 1234 is more specifically the fourth member of the "Triangle of the gods" sequence, obtained by concatenating decimal representations of positive integers. It is also the fifth member of a related integer sequence, obtained from the recurrence relation $a(n)=10a(n-1)+n$ starting from $a(0)=0$ and $a(1)=1$; both this sequence and the aforementioned sequence begin in the same way, yet they diverge around their tenth positions. Because it is not divisible by 4, 1234 is the first number in these sequences that is not divisible by its final digit.

=== Integer partitions ===
1234 is the number of integer partitions of 24 without all distinct multiplicities, as well as the number of partitions of 24 into parts that are prime or semiprime. 1234 is the number of "colored" integer partitions of 12 such that four colors are used and parts differ by size, or by color. It is the number of partitions of 33^{2} = 1089 into exactly four prime numbers. Regarding the fourth non-zero decimal repdigit 44, 1234 is its number of strict partitions containing the sum of some subset of the parts (as a variation of, sum-full strict partitions), as well as the number of partitions of 44 into parts with an odd number of prime divisors (counted with multiplicity).

=== Binary strings ===
1234 is the number of "straight" binary strings of length 22 (i.e., the simplest way of representing quantities with binary numbers), equivalently the number of finite Sturmian words of length 22.

=== Geometric properties ===
1234 is the number of integer-sided non-degenerate quadrilaterals with perimeter of 50. 1234 is also the number of ways to place three non-attacking bishops on a 3 x 8 chessboard. It is a polite number (i.e., trapezoidal number), since it is the sum of four consecutive numbers: "307 + 308 + 309 + 310 = 1234"

==== T-toothpick sequence ====
T-Toothpick sequence (with three equal-sized line segments in T shape) after 32, 33 steps (top), and 49, 50 steps (bottom); respectively. Blue toothpicks represent toothpicks added at that step.

In a variation of the traditional Toothpick sequence, "T-toothpicks" can be formed with three segments of equal length joined at "pivot points" in the shape of a T, which leaves three "endpoints"; these toothpicks are then attached to each other at pivot points with exposed endpoints only (where allowed, see A160172 for further details). A square fractal-like structure in this sequence is generated at steps (5, 9, 17, 33, ...) while another fractal structure with four squares intersecting a larger square at its corners is generated at steps (6, 12, 25, 49, ...). At the thirty-second step, the number of toothpicks is 1234, while at the fiftieth step, the number of toothpicks is 2468, or twice 1234. These represent steps that are one step less than an appearing fractal pattern, and one more (respectively; see image).

==== Vertex sets ====
There are exactly 1234 independent vertex sets in a 4 × 4 square grid. This is equivalent with the ways of choosing a subset of positions in a 4 × 4 grid so that no two chosen positions are adjacent horizontally or vertically. For the corresponding problem in one dimension instead of two (choosing points from a sequence with no two adjacent), the number of solutions represents a Fibonacci number.

=== Other mathematical properties ===
- The expanded form of the number with decimal expansion 1234, would be written as

$1234 = 1 \times 1000 + 2 \times 100 + 3 \times 10 + 4.$

- A parking permutation that avoids 1234 yields a parking function analog of the Schröder numbers.
- 1234 is the amount of digits that the twelfth Fermat number contains.

== In other fields ==
- A 2012 study of frequently-used personal identification numbers (PIN) found that, among 4-digit pin codes, 1234 is the most frequently chosen.
- 1234 can refer to Feist's song titled "1234". The Time magazine pronounced "1234" as one of The 10 Best Songs of 2007, ranking it at number two.
