= Themistocles M. Rassias =

Greek mathematician (born 1951)

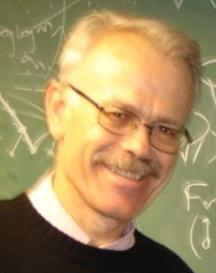
- Rassias around 2005
- Born: April 2, 1951 (age 75); Pellana, Peloponnese, Greece
- Education: University of California, Berkeley (Ph.D.)
- Known for: Hyers–Ulam–Rassias stability Aleksandrov–Rassias problem Cauchy–Rassias stability
- Awards: Doctor Honoris Causa, University of Alba Iulia, Romania (2008) Honorary Doctorate, University of Nis, Serbia (2010) Doctor Honoris Causa, Valahia University of Targoviste, Romania (2016)
- Scientific career
- Fields: Mathematics
- Workplaces: National Technical University of Athens
- Doctoral advisor: Stephen Smale
- Website: http://www.math.ntua.gr/~trassias/

Themistocles M. Rassias (Greek: Θεμιστοκλής Μ. Ρασσιάς; born April 2, 1951) is a Greek mathematician, and a professor at the National Technical University of Athens (Εθνικό Μετσόβιο Πολυτεχνείο), Greece. He has published more than 300 papers, 10 research books and 45 edited volumes in research Mathematics as well as 4 textbooks in Mathematics (in Greek) for university students. His research work has received more than 21,000 citations according to Google Scholar and more than 6,000 citations according to MathSciNet. His h-index is 52. He serves as a member of the Editorial Board of several international mathematical journals.

== Education ==
He received his Ph.D. in Mathematics from the University of California at Berkeley in June 1976. Professor Stephen Smale and Professor Shiing-Shen Chern have been his thesis and academic advisors, respectively.

== Research ==
His work extends over several fields of Mathematical Analysis. It includes Nonlinear Functional Analysis, Functional Equations, Approximation Theory, Analysis on Manifolds, Calculus of Variations, Inequalities, Metric Geometry and their Applications.

He has contributed a number of results in the stability of minimal submanifolds, in the solution of Ulam's Problem for approximate homomorphisms in Banach spaces, in the theory of isometric mappings in metric spaces and in Complex analysis (Poincaré's inequality and harmonic mappings).

=== Terminology ===
(i) Hyers–Ulam–Rassias stability of functional equations.

(ii) The Aleksandrov–Rassias problem for isometric mappings.

== Awards and honors ==
He has received a number of honors and awards including:

- 1977–1978 and 1978–1979, Membership offer from the School of Mathematics of the Institute for Advanced Study in Princeton, that he could not accept for family reasons.
- 1980, Research Associate at the Department of Mathematics of Harvard University, invited by Raoul Bott.
- 1980, Visiting Research Professor at the Department of Mathematics of the Massachusetts Institute of Technology, invited by F. P. Peterson.
- 1985–1986, 1986–1987, Teacher of the Year.
- 1987, Accademico Ordinario of the Accademia Tiberina, Roma.
- 1989–1990, 1990–1991, 1991–1992, Outstanding Faculty Member, University of La Verne, California (Athens Campus).
- 1991, Fellow of the Royal Astronomical Society of London.
- 2003, A volume entitled Stability of Functional Equations of Ulam-Hyers-Rassias Type was dedicated to the 25 years since the publication of Th. M. Rassias' Theorem, edited by S. Czerwik, Hadronic Press Inc., Florida.
- 2007, A special volume of the Banach Journal of Math. Analysis (Vol. 1, Issues 1 & 2) was dedicated to the 30th Anniversary of Th. M. Rassias' Stability Theorem.
- 2008, Doctor Honoris Causa (DHC), University of Alba Iulia (Romania).
- 2009, Α special issue of the Journal Nonlinear Functional Analysis and Applications (Vol.14, No.5) was dedicated to the 30th Anniversary of Th. M. Rassias' Stability Theorem.
- 2010, Ulam Prize in Mathematics.
- 2010, Honorary Doctorate, University of Nis (Serbia).
- 2011, Α special issue of the Journal of Nonlinear Sciences and Applications (Vol.4, No.2) was dedicated to the 60th Anniversary of Th. M. Rassias' birth.
- 2012, A volume entitled Nonlinear Analysis. Stability, Approximation, and Inequalities. In honor of Themistocles M. Rassias on the occasion of his 60th birthday. Eds., P. M. Pardalos; P. G. Georgiev and H. M. Srivastava was published by Springer, New York, 2012, XXIX+893 pp.
- 2016, Doctor Honoris Causa (DHC), Valahia University of Targoviste (Romania) (see also).
- 2016, Award for Lifetime Achievements in Mathematics, Conference on Ulam's Type Stability, Cluj-Napoca, Romania.
- 2025, “World's Top 2% Scientists List”

== Works ==
- Th. M. Rassias, On the stability of the linear mapping in Banach spaces, Proceedings of the American Mathematical Society 72(1978), 297-300. [Translated in Chinese and published in: Mathematical Advance in Translation, Chinese Academy of Sciences 4 (2009), 382-384.]
- Th. M. Rassias, New characterizations of inner product spaces, Bulletin des Sciences Mathematiques, 108 (1984), 95-99.
- Th. M. Rassias, On the stability of functional equations and a problem of Ulam, Acta Applicandae Mathematicae 62(1) (2000), 23-130.
- Th. M. Rassias, Major trends in Mathematics, Newsletter European Math. Soc. 62 (2006), 13-14. Translated in Chinese and published in:Mathematical Advance in Translation, Chinese Academy of Sciences 2 (2008), 172-174.
- Th. M. Rassias and J. Brzdek, Functional Equations in Mathematical Analysis, Springer, New York, 2012.
- Th. M. Rassias and J. Simsa, Finite Sums Decompositions in Mathematical Analysis, John Wiley & Sons Ltd. (Wiley-Interscience Series in Pure and Applied Mathematics), Chichester, New York, Brisbane, Toronto, Singapore, 1995.
