= Włodzimierz Stożek =

Polish mathematician (1883–1941)

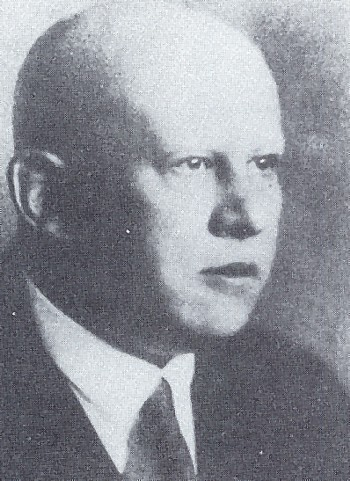
- Born: 23 July 1883; Żółkiew (Zhovkva)
- Died: 3 or 4 July 1941 (aged 57); Lwów (Lviv, now Ukraine)
- Education: Jagiellonian University
- Scientific career
- Fields: Mathematics
- Workplaces: Lwów School of Mathematics
- Doctoral advisor: Stanisław Zaremba
- Doctoral students: Stanislaw Ulam

Włodzimierz Stożek (23 July 1883 – 3 or 4 July 1941) was a Polish mathematician of the Lwów School of Mathematics.

Head of the Mathematics Faculty on the Lwów University of Technology. He was arrested and murdered together with his two sons: the 29-year-old engineer Eustachy and 24-year-old Emanuel, graduate of the Institute of Technology by Germans during the Second World War on 3 or 4 July in Lviv, during the Massacre of Lviv professors.

In December 1944, Stefan Banach wrote the following tribute to Stożek:

Professor Włodzimierz Stożek was an outstanding mathematician, the author of numerous papers on the theory of integral equations, potential theory, as well as on many other branches of mathematics. His work is widely known in Poland and also abroad. He had a very charming personality and was a distinguished scholar, beloved by his young students as someone with a very caring heart. He was always ready to assist anyone who asked for his help. He took little notice of nationality differences. Those of us who were close to him and knew him well now esteem even more highly his enlightened personality and great cultural contributions. He will be remembered as a great intellectual who loved all of humanity and served it faithfully.
