= FERMIAC =

Early computer

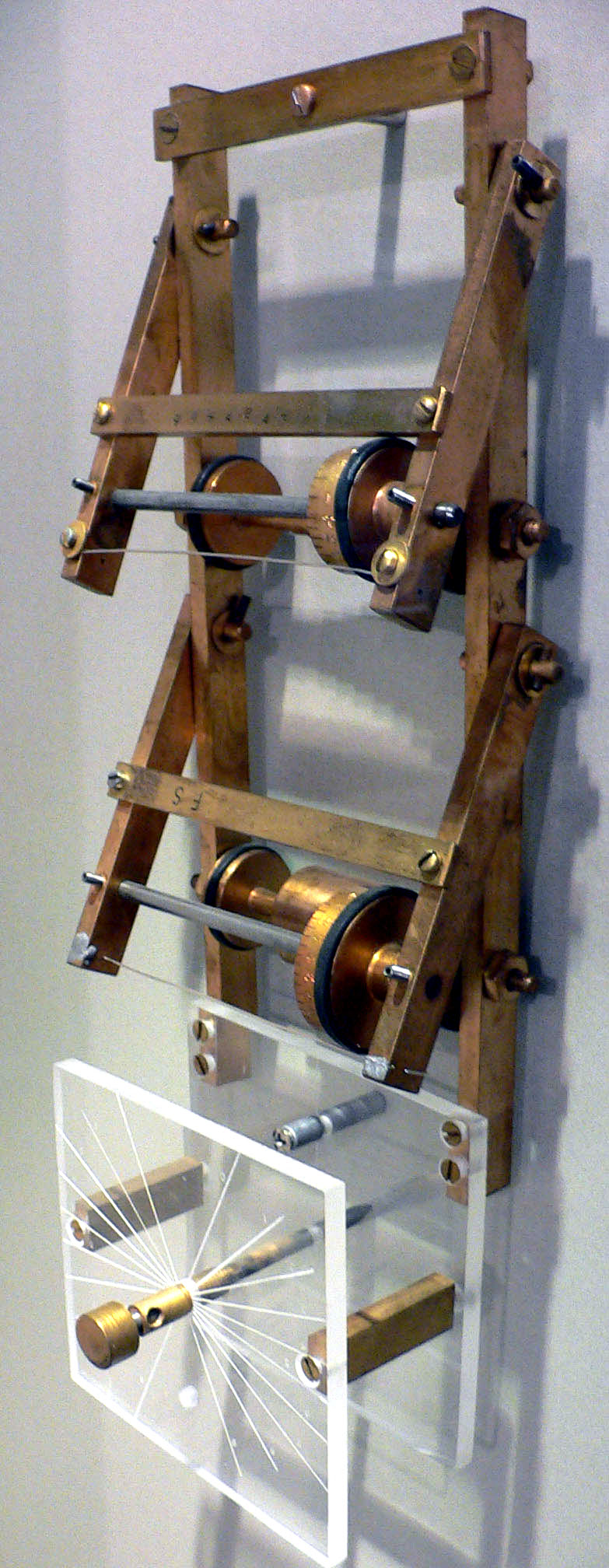
The FERMIAC, or Monte Carlo trolley, was an analog device invented by Enrico Fermi to implement studies of neutron transport.

The Monte Carlo trolley, or FERMIAC, was an analog computer invented by physicist Enrico Fermi to aid in his studies of neutron transport.

== Description ==
The FERMIAC was about 30 centimeters long and resembled a small trolley, the source of its nickname. L. D. P. King built it of brass and acrylic sheet at the Los Alamos Scientific Laboratory. It performed no electronic calculation. Instead, the operator pushed it by hand across a scaled drawing of a nuclear device, tracing probable neutron paths using random numbers from a table.

== Operation ==
The FERMIAC employed the Monte Carlo method to model neutron transport in various types of nuclear systems. Given an initial distribution of neutrons, the goal of the process is to develop numerous "neutron genealogies", or models of the behavior of individual neutrons, including each collision, scattering, and fission. When a fission occurs, the number of emerging neutrons is predicted, and the behavior of each of these neutrons is eventually modeled in the same manner as the first. At each stage, pseudo-random numbers are used to make decisions that affect the behavior of each neutron.

The FERMIAC used this method to create two-dimensional neutron genealogies on a scale diagram of a nuclear device. A series of drums on the device were set according to the material being crossed and a random choice between fast and slow neutrons. Random numbers also determined the direction of travel and the distance until the next collision. Once the drums were set, the trolley was rolled across the diagram, drawing a path as it went. Any time a change in material was indicated on the diagram, the drum settings were adjusted accordingly before continuing.

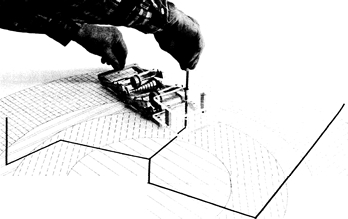
The Fermiac in use

To use the FERMIAC, an operator needed a scaled drawing of the device, tables of physical data, and a list of random numbers. A ten-step brass roller measured how far a neutron would travel in a given material before its next collision. Each segment of the neutron's path was then drawn on the diagram.

== History ==
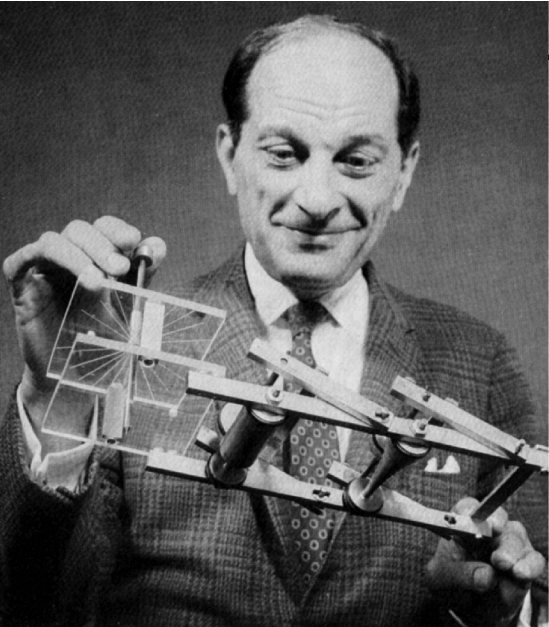
Stanisław Ulam holding the FERMIAC

In the early 1930s, Italian physicist Enrico Fermi led a team of young scientists, dubbed the "Via Panisperna boys", in their now-famous experiments in nuclear physics. During this time, Fermi developed "statistical sampling" techniques that he effectively employed to predict the results of experiments.

Years later, in 1946, Fermi participated in the initial review of results from the ENIAC. Among the others present was Los Alamos mathematician Stanislaw Ulam, who was familiar with the use of statistical sampling techniques similar to those previously developed by Fermi. Such techniques had mainly fallen out of use, due to the long, repetitious calculations required. However, given ENIAC's powers of calculation, Ulam saw an opportunity to resurrect these techniques. He discussed his ideas with John von Neumann, who eventually used the ENIAC to implement the Monte Carlo method (as the statistical sampling techniques came to be called) to solve a variety of neutron transport problems.

However, before the ENIAC could be employed for this purpose, it first had to be moved to its permanent home at the Ballistics Research Laboratory. It was during this interruption in ENIAC operation that Fermi came up with the idea for his analog device. According to Sood et al., during a 1947 visit to Los Alamos, Fermi discussed the concept with his colleague L. D. P. King at a family picnic; King then built the instrument, which was later given the fitting name FERMIAC. The device was used for approximately two years.

In 2015, the Museo Storico della Fisica e Centro Studi e Ricerche "Enrico Fermi" created a replica of the device.

== Use at Los Alamos ==
From 1947 to 1949, the FERMIAC was used by the Theoretical Division group led by Bengt Carlson to model various nuclear systems, typically tracing at least 100 source neutrons across a scaled diagram of an assembly. By following whether the simulated neutron population grew, declined, or held steady over successive generations, analysts could characterize a configuration as supercritical, subcritical, or critical. The trolley allowed such studies to proceed by hand during the period when electronic Monte Carlo calculations were not yet routinely available. According to Carlson, "although the trolley itself had become obsolete by 1949, the lessons learned from it were invaluable."

== Computing context and legacy ==
Los Alamos in the 1940s relied on several kinds of calculation. Teams of human "computers", many of them women, worked at desk calculators, and the Theoretical Division also used IBM punch-card machines. The FERMIAC was a compact, special-purpose tool for neutron transport, used when no electronic computer was available.

Stanisław Ulam, John von Neumann, and Nicholas Metropolis developed the Monte Carlo method at Los Alamos in the late 1940s. ENIAC ran the first electronic Monte Carlo calculations in 1948. Fermi designed the FERMIAC as a stopgap during the ENIAC's relocation to Aberdeen Proving Ground. Digital implementations followed: first the ENIAC itself, and later the MANIAC, which Metropolis built at Los Alamos in 1952. The original FERMIAC is on display at the Bradbury Science Museum in Los Alamos, New Mexico.

== See also ==
- Planimeter
- Neutrons
- Nuclear fission
- Computer simulation
- Ray tracing

== Further articles ==
- What is the FERMIAC or Fermi Trolley? by The Bradbury Science Museum is operated by Los Alamos National Laboratory for education, 2017
