= Aleksandrov–Rassias problem =

The theory of isometries in the framework of Banach spaces has its beginning in a paper by Stanisław Mazur and Stanisław M. Ulam in 1932. They proved the Mazur–Ulam theorem stating that every isometry of a normed real linear space onto a normed real linear space is a linear mapping up to translation. In 1970, Aleksandr Danilovich Aleksandrov asked whether the existence of a single distance that is preserved by a mapping implies that it is an isometry, as it does for Euclidean spaces by the Beckman–Quarles theorem. Themistocles M. Rassias posed the following problem:

Aleksandrov–Rassias Problem. If X and Y are normed linear spaces and if T : X → Y is a continuous and/or surjective mapping such that whenever vectors x and y in X satisfy $\lVert x-y \rVert=1$, then $\lVert T(x)-T(y) \rVert=1$ (the distance one preserving property or DOPP), is T then necessarily an isometry?

There have been several attempts in the mathematical literature by a number of researchers for the solution to this problem.
