= Françoise Aron Ulam =

Polish mathematician

- Born: Françoise Aron; March 8, 1918; Paris, France
- Died: April 30, 2011 (aged 93); Santa Fe, New Mexico
- Spouse: Stanislaw Ulam
- Children: Claire Anne Weiner (née Ulam)

External image
- Claire Ulam at MANIAC panel, 1955 Science Photo Library C024/0659

Françoise Aron Ulam (March 8, 1918, in Paris, France — April 30, 2011) was the wife of Polish-American mathematician, Stanislaw Ulam, member of the Manhattan Project.

== Biography ==
In 1938, she came to the United States as an exchange student. She studied at Mills College and Mount Holyoke College, earning Master's degree in comparative literature.

In 1939 she met Stanislaw Ulam and married him in 1941. She followed Stanislaw's involvement in the Manhattan Project in Santa Fe and Los Alamos.

In Los Alamos, Francoise, while not being a member of the Project staff, became part of the international community of scientists and mathematicians. She devoted herself to creating a home and raising a daughter, Claire.

She was granted American citizenship in 1945.

Both Françoise and Stanislaw lost family members in the Holocaust.

In 1984, when her husband died, Françoise arranged for Santa Fe Institute to receive Stanislaw Ulam's library.

in 1998 she published her memoirs, De Paris à Los Alamos: Une odyssée franco-américaine [From Paris to Los Alamos: A Franco-American Odyssey].

She is the grandmother of Rebecca Weiner, New York Police Department’s deputy commissioner of intelligence and counterterrorism.

On April 30, 2011, Françoise died at the El Castillo retirement community in Santa Fe. Françoise was buried in Paris.

== Books ==
- (co-editor) Analogies Between Analogies: The Mathematical Reports of S.M. Ulam and his Los Alamos Collaborators (Los Alamos Series in Basic and Applied Sciences) , 1990, ISBN 978-0520052901
- De Paris a Los Alamos, Une odyssée franco-americaine (French Edition), 1998, ISBN 978-2738459626 - memoir
