= International Society of Social Defence =

International learned society devoted to criminal policy

- Société internationale de défense sociale pour une politique criminelle humaniste
- Abbreviation: ISSD; SIDS
- Formation: October 1949
- Type: International learned society
- Legal status: Non-governmental organisation in consultative status with the United Nations Economic and Social Council
- Purpose: Criminal policy, criminal law and criminology
- President: Luis Arroyo Zapatero
- Publication: Cahiers de défense sociale
- Website: defensesociale.org

The International Society of Social Defence (ISSD; French: Société internationale de défense sociale pour une politique criminelle humaniste, SIDS) is an international learned society concerned with criminal policy. Established as a permanent organisation in 1949, it brings together legal scholars, criminologists and criminal justice practitioners. Its work emphasises crime prevention, the social reintegration of offenders and the protection of fundamental rights. The society has held consultative status with the United Nations Economic and Social Council since 1953. Its president is the Spanish criminal-law scholar Luis Arroyo Zapatero.

Research on the transnational legal and criminological networks that developed after the Second World War places the ISSD among four principal non-governmental organisations working in international criminal justice, alongside the International Association of Penal Law, the International Society of Criminology and the International Penal and Penitentiary Foundation.

== History ==
The society developed from the International Centre of Social Defence, founded in Genoa in 1945 by the Italian jurist Filippo Gramatica. A first international congress was held in Sanremo in 1947. At the second International Congress of Social Defence, held in Liège in October 1949, the movement established a permanent organisation with Gramatica as its first president. Its international congresses, including the 1954 meeting in Antwerp, helped to disseminate social-defence ideas among different legal systems.

Two approaches emerged within the early movement. Gramatica advocated a radical transformation of criminal law in which traditional punishment would be replaced by social-defence measures adapted to the individual. The French judge and legal scholar Marc Ancel developed a reformist approach known as the new social defence. It retained the guarantees of the rule of law while giving greater weight to individualised sentencing, human dignity and the rehabilitation of offenders. Ancel became president of the society in 1966. In 1996, the organisation expanded its name to include an explicit reference to a “humane criminal policy”.

== Approach and activities ==
The ISSD promotes a criminal policy combining the protection of society with the prevention of reoffending, the rehabilitation of convicted people and respect for human rights. Its work has addressed the individualisation of criminal sanctions, prison systems, international harmonisation of criminal law, organised crime and the abolition of capital punishment.

The society organises international congresses and academic meetings and participates in activities connected with the United Nations crime-prevention and criminal-justice programme. Its sixteenth international congress, held in Mexico City in 2012, examined criminal policy and penal reform.

== Publications ==
The organisation began publishing a bulletin on social-defence doctrine and its international activities in 1955. It was succeeded by the journal Cahiers de défense sociale, ISSN 0223-582X.

== See also ==
- Penology
- Rehabilitation (penology)
