= Multipliers and centralizers (Banach spaces) =

In mathematics, multipliers and centralizers are algebraic objects in the study of Banach spaces. They are used, for example, in generalizations of the Banach–Stone theorem.

== Definitions ==
Let (X, ‖·‖) be a Banach space over a field K (either the real or complex numbers), and let Ext(X) be the set of extreme points of the closed unit ball of the continuous dual space X^{∗}.

A continuous linear operator T : X → X is said to be a multiplier if every point p in Ext(X) is an eigenvector for the adjoint operator T^{∗} : X^{∗} → X^{∗}. That is, there exists a function a_{T} : Ext(X) → K such that

$$p \circ T = a_{T} (p) p \; \mbox{ for all } p \in \mathrm{Ext} (X),$$

making $a_{T} (p)$ the eigenvalue corresponding to p. Given two multipliers S and T on X, S is said to be an adjoint for T if

$$a_{S} = \overline{a_{T}},$$

i.e. a_{S} agrees with a_{T} in the real case, and with the complex conjugate of a_{T} in the complex case.

The centralizer (or commutant) of X, denoted Z(X), is the set of all multipliers on X for which an adjoint exists.

== Properties ==
- The multiplier adjoint of a multiplier T, if it exists, is unique; the unique adjoint of T is denoted T^{∗}.
- If the field K is the real numbers, then every multiplier on X lies in the centralizer of X.

== See also ==
- Centralizer and normalizer
