= T-square (fractal) =

Two-dimensional fractal

In mathematics, the T-square is a two-dimensional fractal. It has a boundary of infinite length bounding a finite area. Its name comes from the drawing instrument known as a T-square.

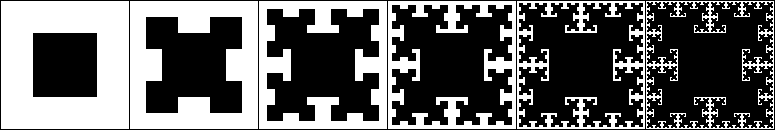

== Algorithmic description ==
T-square of order 8

It can be generated from using this algorithm:

1. Draw a black square.
2. For each convex corner in the image, draw another square, centered at that corner, with half the side length of the squares drawn in the previous step.
3. Repeat step 2.

Golden squares with T-branching

Square branches, related by the 1/φ

Squares branches, related by 1/2

The method of creation is rather similar to the ones used to create a Koch snowflake or a Sierpinski triangle, "both based on recursively drawing equilateral triangles and the Sierpinski carpet."

== Properties ==
The T-square fractal has a fractal dimension of ln(4)/ln(2) = 2. The black surface extent is almost everywhere in the bigger square, for once a point has been darkened, it remains black for every other iteration; however some points remain white.

The fractal dimension of the boundary equals $\textstyle{\frac{\log{3}}{\log{2}}=1.58496250...}$.

Using mathematical induction one can prove that for each n ≥ 2 the number of new squares that are added at stage n equals $4*3^{(n-1)}$.

== The T-Square and the chaos game ==
The T-square fractal can also be generated by an adaptation of the chaos game, in which a point jumps repeatedly half-way towards the randomly chosen vertices of a square. The T-square appears when the jumping point is unable to target the vertex directly opposite the vertex previously chosen. That is, if the current vertex is v[i] and the previous vertex was v[i-1], then v[i] ≠ v[i-1] + vinc, where vinc = 2 and modular arithmetic means that 3 + 2 = 1, 4 + 2 = 2:

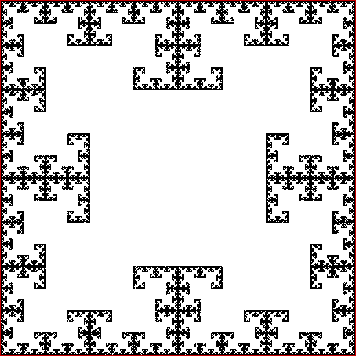
Randomly chosen v[i] ≠ v[i-1] + 2

If vinc is given different values, allomorphs of the T-square appear that are computationally equivalent to the T-square but very different in appearance:

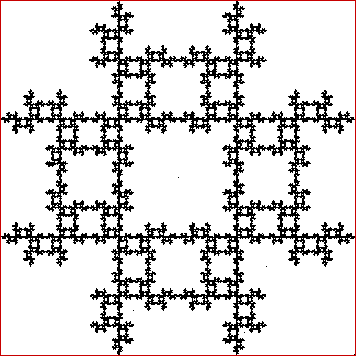
Randomly chosen v[i] ≠ v[i-1] + 0

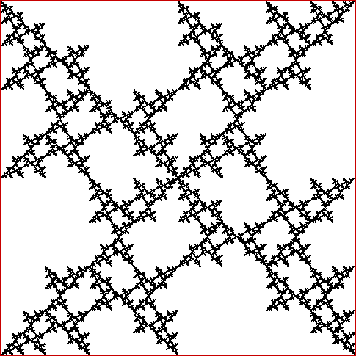
Randomly chosen v[i] ≠ v[i-1] + 1

== T-square fractal and Sierpiński triangle ==
The T-square fractal can be derived from the Sierpiński triangle, and vice versa, by adjusting the angle at which sub-elements of the original fractal are added from the center outwards.

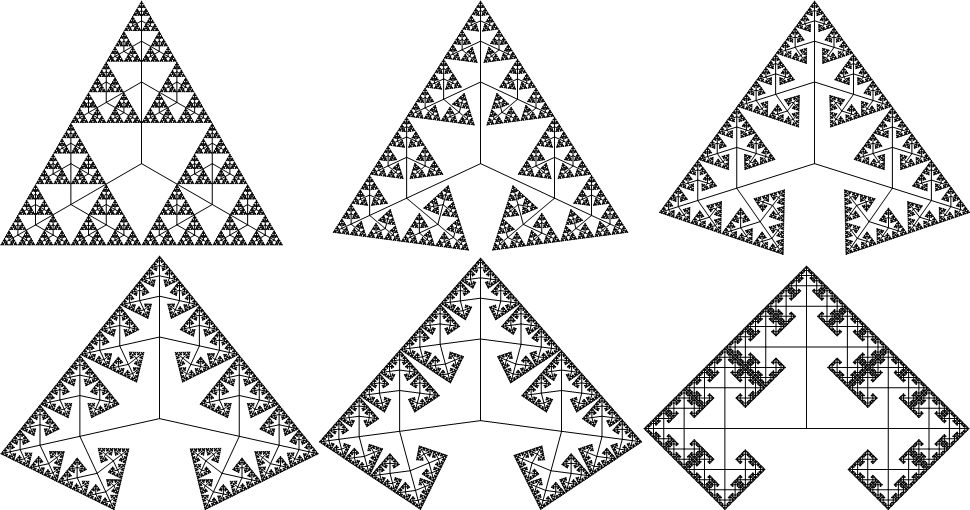
Sierpiński triangle transforming into a T-square fractal

== See also ==
- List of fractals by Hausdorff dimension
- The Toothpick sequence generates a similar pattern
- H tree
