= Ray tracing =

Ray tracing is a method for calculating the path of waves or particles through a system. The method is practiced in two distinct, but related, forms:

- Ray tracing (physics), which is used for analyzing optical and other systems
- Ray tracing (graphics), which is used for 3D image generation
