= Ulam matrix =

Term in mathematical set theory

In mathematical set theory, an Ulam matrix is an array of subsets of a cardinal number with certain properties. Ulam matrices were introduced by Stanislaw Ulam in his 1930 work on measurable cardinals: they may be used, for example, to show that a real-valued measurable cardinal is weakly inaccessible.

== Definition ==
Suppose that $\kappa$ and $\lambda$ are cardinal numbers, and let $\mathcal F$ be a $\lambda$-complete filter on $\lambda$. An Ulam matrix is a collection of subsets $A_{\alpha \beta}$ of $\lambda$ indexed by $\alpha \in \kappa, \beta \in \lambda$ such that

- If $\beta \ne \gamma \in \lambda$ then $A_{\alpha \beta}$ and $A_{\alpha \gamma}$ are disjoint.
- For each $\beta \in \lambda$, the union over $\alpha \in \kappa$ of the sets $A_{\alpha \beta}, \, \bigcup\left\{A_{\alpha \beta}:\alpha \in \kappa\right\}$, is in the filter $\mathcal F$.

== Bibliography ==
- Ulam, Stanisław (1930), "Zur Masstheorie in der allgemeinen Mengenlehre", Fundamenta Mathematicae, 16 (1): 140–150, doi:10.4064/fm-16-1-140-150
