= Fermi filter =

The Fermi filter is a common image processing filter that uses the Fermi–Dirac distribution in the frequency domain to perform a low-pass filter or high-pass filter similar to a Gaussian blur, but the harshness can be scaled.
