= Fermi glow =

Space phenomenon

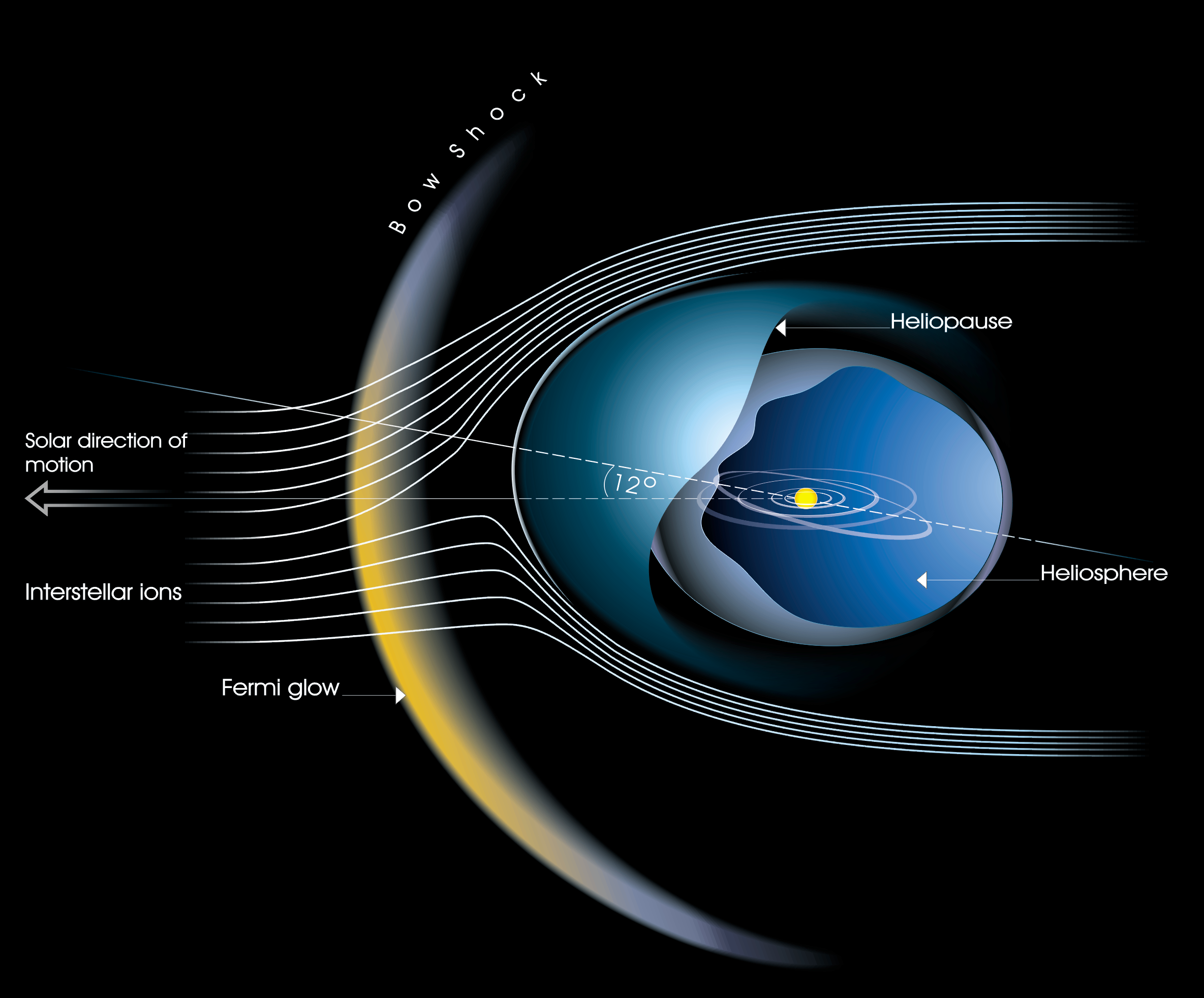
Heliosphere and its different structures with conjectured Fermi glow.

The Fermi glow consists of ultraviolet-glowing particles, mostly hydrogen, originating from the Solar System's bow shock, created when light from stars and the Sun enter the region between the heliopause and the interstellar medium and undergo Fermi acceleration, bouncing around the transition area several times, gaining energy via collisions with atoms of the interstellar medium. The first evidence of the Fermi glow, and hence the bow shock, was obtained with the help from Voyager 1 and the Hubble Space Telescope.

In 2012, data collected from the Interstellar Boundary Explorer satellite and Voyager 1 and 2 indicated that the Sun isn't moving fast enough through its current interstellar environment to have a bow shock.

== See also ==
- Heliosphere
  - Heliopause
- Termination shock
- Bow shock
