= Ulam's game =

Mathematical guessing game

Ulam's game, or the Rényi–Ulam game, is a mathematical game similar to the popular game of twenty questions. In Ulam's game, a player attempts to guess an unnamed object or number by asking yes–no questions of another, but one of the answers given may be a lie.

Alfréd Rényi (1961) introduced the game in a 1961 paper, based on Hungary's Bar Kokhba game, but the paper was overlooked for many years.

Stanisław Ulam rediscovered the game, presenting the idea that there are a million objects and the answer to one question can be wrong, and considered the minimum number of questions required, and the strategy that should be adopted. Pelc gave a survey of similar games and their relation to information theory.

== See also ==
- Knights and Knaves
