= Fermi–Pustyl'nikov model =

The Fermi–Pustyl'nikov model, named after Enrico Fermi and Lev Pustyl'nikov, is a model of the Fermi acceleration mechanism.

A point mass falls with a constant acceleration vertically on the infinitely heavy horizontal wall, which moves vertically in accordance with analytic periodic law in time. The point interacts with the wall by the law of elastic collision. For this model it was proved that under some general conditions the velocity and energy of the point at the moments of collisions with the wall tend to infinity for an open set of initial data having the infinite Lebesgue measure. This model was introduced in 1968 in, and studied in, by L. D. Pustyl'nikov in connection with the justification of the Fermi acceleration mechanism.

(See also and references therein).
