= Valahia University of Târgoviște =

University in Romania

Coordinates: 44.923934°N 25.457484°E

- Universitatea Valahia din Târgoviște
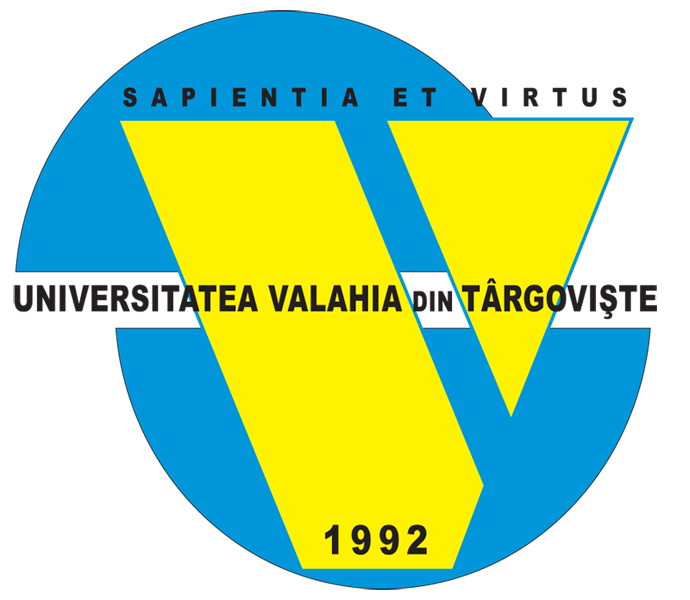
- Valahia University of Târgoviște official logo
- Motto: Sapientia et Virtus
- Type: Public
- Established: 1992
- Rector: Ioan Corneliu Sălișteanu
- Administrative staff: ~400
- Students: 10,000
- Location: Târgoviște, Romania
- Website: www.valahia.ro

The Valahia University of Târgovişte is a university in Târgoviște, Dâmbovița County, Romania.

== Organization ==
These are the 10 faculties in which the university is divided into:

- Faculty of Economics
- Faculty of Law and Administrative Sciences
- Faculty of Electrical Engineering, Electronics and Information Technology
- Faculty of Environmental Engineering and Food Science
- Faculty of Humanities
- Faculty of Orthodox Theology and Educational Science
- Faculty of Materials Engineering and Mechanics
- Faculty of Political Sciences, Letters and Communication
- Faculty of Sciences and Arts
- Faculty of Sciences and Engineering Alexandria
