= Fermi–Ulam model =

Dynamical system

The Fermi–Ulam model (FUM) is a dynamical system that was introduced by Polish mathematician Stanislaw Ulam in 1961.

FUM is a variant of Enrico Fermi's primary work on acceleration of cosmic rays, namely Fermi acceleration. The system consists of a particle that collides elastically between a fixed wall and a moving one, each of infinite mass. The walls represent the magnetic mirrors with which the cosmic particles collide.

A. J. Lichtenberg and M. A. Lieberman provided a simplified version of FUM (SFUM) that derives from the Poincaré surface of section $x=const.$ and writes

$$u_{n+1} = \left|u_n+U_\text{wall}(\varphi_n)\right|$$

$$\varphi_{n+1} = \varphi_n + \frac{kM}{u_{n+1}} \pmod k,$$

where $u_n$ is the velocity of the particle after the $n$-th collision with the fixed wall, $\varphi_n$ is the corresponding phase of the moving wall, $U_\text{wall}$ is the velocity law of the moving wall and $M$ is the stochasticity parameter of the system.

If the velocity law of the moving wall is differentiable enough, according to KAM theorem invariant curves in the phase space $(\varphi,u)$ exist. These invariant curves act as barriers that do not allow for a particle to further accelerate and the average velocity of a population of particles saturates after finite iterations of the map. For instance, for sinusoidal velocity law of the moving wall such curves exist, while they do not for sawtooth velocity law that is discontinuous. Consequently, at the first case particles cannot accelerate infinitely, reversely to what happens at the last one.

Over the years FUM became a prototype model for studying non-linear dynamics and coupled mappings.

The rigorous solution of the Fermi-Ulam problem (the velocity and energy of the particle are bounded) was given first by L. D. Pustyl'nikov in (see also and references therein).

In spite of these negative results, if one considers the Fermi–Ulam model in the framework of the special theory of relativity, then under some general conditions the energy of the particle tends to infinity for an open set of initial data.

== 2D generalization ==
Though the 1D Fermi–Ulam model does not lead to acceleration for smooth oscillations, unbounded energy growth has been observed in 2D billiards with oscillating boundaries, The growth rate of energy in chaotic billiards is found to be much larger than that in billiards that are integrable in the static limit.

Strongly chaotic billiard with oscillating boundary can serve as a paradigm for driven chaotic systems. In the experimental arena this topic arises in the theory of nuclear friction, and more recently in the studies of cold atoms that are trapped in optical billiards. The driving induces diffusion in energy, and consequently the absorption coefficient is determined by the Kubo formula.
