= Fermi acceleration =

Acceleration phenomenon of oft-reflected charged particles

Fermi acceleration, sometimes referred to as diffusive shock acceleration (a subclass of Fermi acceleration), is the acceleration that charged particles undergo when being repeatedly reflected, usually by a magnetic mirror (see also Centrifugal mechanism of acceleration). It receives its name from physicist Enrico Fermi, who first proposed the mechanism. It is thought to be the primary mechanism by which particles gain non-thermal energies in astrophysical shock waves. It plays a very important role in many astrophysical models, mainly of shocks including solar flares and supernova remnants.

There are two types of Fermi acceleration: first-order Fermi acceleration (in shocks) and second-order Fermi acceleration (in the environment of moving magnetized gas clouds). In both cases, the environment has to be collisionless in order for the mechanism to be effective. This is because Fermi acceleration only applies to particles with energies exceeding the thermal energies, and frequent collisions with surrounding particles will cause severe energy loss, resulting in no acceleration.

== First order Fermi acceleration ==
Shock waves typically have moving magnetic inhomogeneities both preceding and following them. Consider the case of a charged particle traveling through the shock wave (from upstream to downstream). If it encounters a moving change in the magnetic field, this can reflect it back through the shock (downstream to upstream) at increased velocity. If a similar process occurs upstream, the particle will again gain energy. These multiple reflections greatly increase its energy. The resulting energy spectrum of many particles undergoing this process (assuming that they do not influence the structure of the shock) turns out to be a power law:
$$\frac{dN(\varepsilon)}{d\varepsilon}\propto \varepsilon ^{-p}$$
where the spectral index $p \gtrsim 2$ depends, for non-relativistic shocks, only on the compression ratio of the shock.

The term "First order" comes from the fact that the energy gain per shock crossing is proportional to $\beta_s$, the velocity of the shock divided by the speed of light.

=== The injection problem ===
A mystery of first order Fermi processes is the injection problem. In the environment of a shock, only particles with energies that exceed the thermal energy by much (a factor of a few at least) can cross the shock and 'enter the game' of acceleration. It is presently unclear what mechanism causes the particles to initially have energies sufficiently high to do so.

== Second order Fermi acceleration ==
Second order Fermi acceleration relates to the amount of energy gained during the motion of a charged particle in the presence of randomly moving "magnetic mirrors". So, if the magnetic mirror is moving towards the particle, the particle will end up with increased energy upon reflection. The opposite holds if the mirror is receding. This notion was used by Fermi (1949) to explain the mode of formation of cosmic rays. In this case the magnetic mirror is a moving interstellar magnetized cloud. In a random motion environment, Fermi argued, the probability of a head-on collision is greater than a head-tail collision, so particles would, on average, be accelerated. This random process is now called second-order Fermi acceleration, because the mean energy gain per bounce depends on the mirror velocity squared, $\beta_m^2$. The resulting energy spectrum anticipated from this physical setup, however, is not universal as in the case of diffusive shock acceleration.

== See also ==
- Fermi-Ulam model
- Fermi glow
- Shock waves in astrophysics
