= Ulam's packing conjecture =

Geometry hypothesis

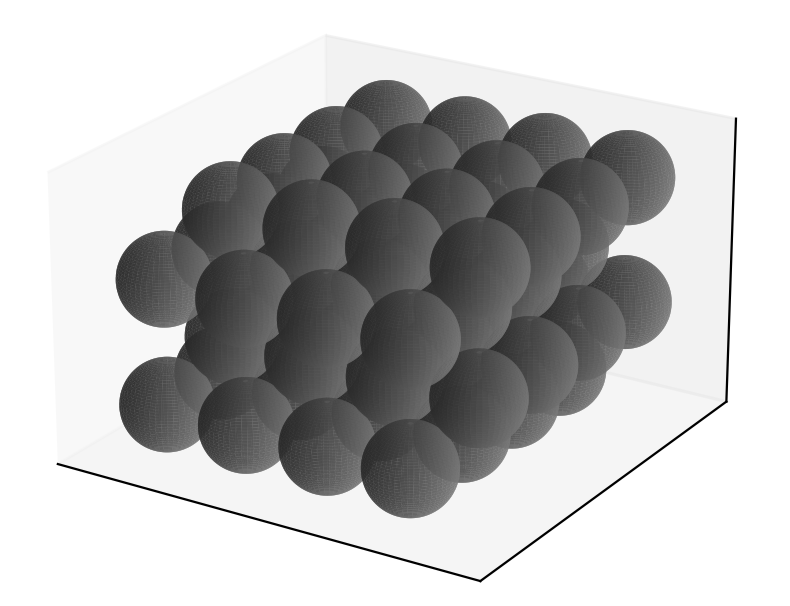
The optimal packing of spheres, leaving an average empty space of ≈25.95%

Unsolved problem in mathematics
Is there any three-dimensional convex body with lower packing density than the sphere?
More unsolved problems in mathematics

Ulam's packing conjecture, named for Stanisław Ulam, is a conjecture about the highest possible packing density of identical convex solids in three-dimensional Euclidean space. The conjecture says that the optimal density for packing congruent spheres is smaller than that for any other convex body. That is, according to the conjecture, the ball is the convex solid which forces the largest fraction of space to remain empty in its optimal packing structure. This conjecture is therefore related to the Kepler conjecture about sphere packing. Since the solution to the Kepler conjecture establishes that identical balls must leave ≈25.95% of the space empty, Ulam's conjecture is equivalent to the statement that no other convex solid forces that much space to be left empty.

== Origin ==
This conjecture was attributed posthumously to Ulam by Martin Gardner, who remarks in a postscript added to one of his Mathematical Games columns that Ulam communicated this conjecture to him in 1972. Though the original reference to the conjecture states only that Ulam "suspected" the ball to be the worst case for packing, the statement has been subsequently taken as a conjecture.

== Supporting arguments ==
Numerical experiments with a large variety of convex solids have resulted in each case in the construction of packings that leave less empty space than is left by close-packing of equal spheres, and so many solids have been ruled out as counterexamples of Ulam's conjecture. Nevertheless, there is an infinite space of possible shapes that have not been ruled out.

Yoav Kallus has shown that at least among point-symmetric bodies, the ball constitutes a local maximum of the fraction of empty space forced. That is, any point-symmetric solid that does not deviate too much from a ball can be packed with greater efficiency than can balls.

== Analogs in other dimensions ==
The analog of Ulam's packing conjecture in two dimensions would say that no convex shape forces more than ≈9.31% of the plane to remain uncovered, since that is the fraction of empty space left uncovered in the densest packing of disks. However, the regular octagon and smoothed octagon give counter-examples. It is conjectured that regular heptagons force the largest fraction of the plane to remain uncovered. In dimensions above four (excluding 8 and 24), the situation is complicated by the fact that the analogs of the Kepler conjecture remain open.
