= Reconstruction conjecture =

Conjecture in graph theory

Unsolved problem in mathematics
Are graphs uniquely determined by their subgraphs?
More unsolved problems in mathematics

In graph theory, informally, the reconstruction conjecture says that graphs are determined uniquely by their subgraphs. It is due to Kelly and Ulam.

== Formal statements ==
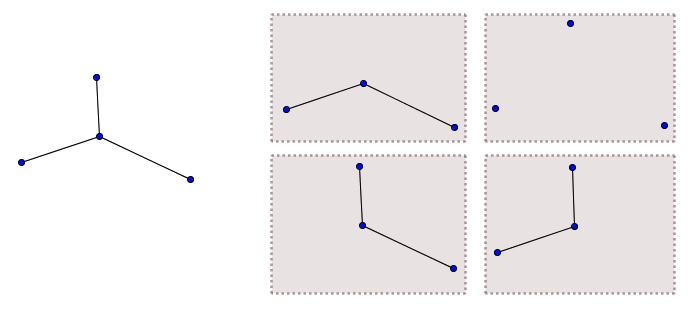
A graph and the associated deck of single-vertex-deleted subgraphs. Note some of the cards show isomorphic graphs.

Given a graph $G = (V,E)$, a vertex-deleted subgraph of $G$ is a subgraph formed by deleting exactly one vertex from $G$. By definition, it is an induced subgraph of $G$.

For a graph $G$, the deck of G, denoted $D(G)$, is the multiset of isomorphism classes of all vertex-deleted subgraphs of $G$. Each graph in $D(G)$ is called a card. Two graphs that have the same deck are said to be hypomorphic.

With these definitions, the conjecture can be stated as:

- Reconstruction Conjecture: Any two hypomorphic graphs on at least three vertices are isomorphic.

(The requirement that the graphs have at least three vertices is necessary because both graphs on two vertices have the same decks.)

Harary suggested a stronger version of the conjecture:

- Set Reconstruction Conjecture: Any two graphs on at least four vertices with the same sets of vertex-deleted subgraphs are isomorphic.

Given a graph $G = (V,E)$, an edge-deleted subgraph of $G$ is a subgraph formed by deleting exactly one edge from $G$.

For a graph $G$, the edge-deck of G, denoted $ED(G)$, is the multiset of all isomorphism classes of edge-deleted subgraphs of $G$. Each graph in $ED(G)$ is called an edge-card.

- Edge Reconstruction Conjecture: (Harary, 1964) Any two graphs with at least four edges and having the same edge-decks are isomorphic.

== Recognizable properties ==
In context of the reconstruction conjecture, a graph property is called recognizable if one can determine the property from the deck of a graph. The following properties of graphs are recognizable:

- Order of the graph – The order of a graph $G$, $|V(G)|$ is recognizable from $D(G)$ as the multiset $D(G)$ contains each subgraph of $G$ created by deleting one vertex of $G$. Hence $|V(G)| = |D(G)|$
- Number of edges of the graph – The number of edges in a graph $G$ with $n$ vertices, $|E(G)|$ is recognizable. First note that each edge of $G$ occurs in $n-2$ members of $D(G)$. This is true by the definition of $D(G)$ which ensures that each edge is included every time that each of the vertices it is incident with is included in a member of $D(G)$, so an edge will occur in every member of $D(G)$ except for the two in which its endpoints are deleted. Hence, $|E(G)| = \sum \frac{q_i}{n-2}$ where $q_i$ is the number of edges in the ith member of $D(G)$.
- Number of Subgraphs of order $k<n$ (Kelly's Lemma) - Generalizing the edge count strategy, we can say for some subgraph $H$ with $k$ vertices in $G$ with $n$ vertices, the number of times $H$ appears in $G$ (referred to as $\binom{G}{H}$) is reconstructible. As every instance of $H$ in G will appear in exactly all the cards in which a vertex of $H$ is not removed, each distinct instance of $H$ will appear in $n-k$ cards. As such, $\binom{G}{H} = \sum \frac{\binom{D_i}{H}}{n-k}$, where $D_i$ is the $i$th card.
- Degree sequence – The degree sequence of a graph $G$ is recognizable because the degree of every vertex is recognizable. To find the degree of a vertex $v_i$—the vertex absent from the ith member of $D(G)$—, we will examine the graph created by deleting it, $G_i$. This graph contains all of the edges not incident with $v_i$, so if $q_i$ is the number of edges in $G_i$, then $|E(G)| - q_i = \deg(v_i)$. If we can tell the degree of every vertex in the graph, we can tell the degree sequence of the graph.
- (Vertex-)Connectivity – By definition, a graph is $n$-vertex-connected when deleting any vertex creates a $n-1$-vertex-connected graph; thus, if every card is a $n-1$-vertex-connected graph, we know the original graph was $n$-vertex-connected. We can also determine if the original graph was connected, as this is equivalent to having any two of the $G_i$ being connected.
- Tutte polynomial
- Characteristic polynomial
- Planarity
- The number of spanning trees in a graph
- Chromatic polynomial
- Being a perfect graph or an interval graph, or certain other subclasses of perfect graphs

== Verification ==
Both the reconstruction and set reconstruction conjectures have been verified for all graphs with at most 13 vertices by Brendan McKay.

In a probabilistic sense, it has been shown by Béla Bollobás that almost all graphs are reconstructible. This means that the probability that a randomly chosen graph on $n$ vertices is not reconstructible goes to 0 as $n$ goes to infinity. In fact, it was shown that not only are almost all graphs reconstructible, but in fact that the entire deck is not necessary to reconstruct them — almost all graphs have the property that there exist three cards in their deck that uniquely determine the graph.

=== Reconstructible graph families ===
The conjecture has been verified for a number of infinite classes of graphs (and, trivially, their complements).

- Regular graphs - Regular Graphs are reconstructible by direct application of some of the facts that can be recognized from the deck of a graph. Given an $n$-regular graph $G$ and its deck $D(G)$, we can recognize that the deck is of a regular graph by recognizing its degree sequence. Let us now examine one member of the deck $D(G)$, $G_i$. This graph contains some number of vertices with a degree of $n$ and $n$ vertices with a degree of $n-1$. We can add a vertex to this graph and then connect it to the $n$ vertices of degree $n-1$ to create an $n$-regular graph which is isomorphic to the graph which we started with. Therefore, all regular graphs are reconstructible from their decks. A particular type of regular graph which is interesting is the complete graph.
- Trees
- Disconnected graphs
- Unit interval graphs
- Separable graphs without end vertices
- Maximal planar graphs
- Maximal outerplanar graphs
- Outerplanar graphs
- Critical blocks

== Reduction ==
The reconstruction conjecture is true if all 2-connected graphs are reconstructible.

== Duality ==
The vertex reconstruction conjecture obeys the duality that if $G$ can be reconstructed from its vertex deck $D(G)$, then its complement $G'$ can be reconstructed from $D(G')$ as follows: Start with $D(G')$, take the complement of every card in it to get $D(G)$, use this to reconstruct $G$, then take the complement again to get $G'$.

Edge reconstruction does not obey any such duality: Indeed, for some classes of edge-reconstructible graphs it is not known if their complements are edge reconstructible.

== Other structures ==
It has been shown that the following are not in general reconstructible:

- Digraphs: Infinite families of non-reconstructible digraphs are known, including tournaments (Stockmeyer) and non-tournaments (Stockmeyer). A tournament is reconstructible if it is not strongly connected. A weaker version of the reconstruction conjecture has been conjectured for digraphs, see new digraph reconstruction conjecture.
- Hypergraphs, including all k-uniform hypergraphs for k>2 (Kocay).
- Infinite graphs. If T is the tree where every vertex has countably infinite degree, then the union of two disjoint copies of T is hypomorphic, but not isomorphic, to T.(Fisher)
- Locally finite graphs, which are graphs where every vertex has finite degree. The question of reconstructibility for locally finite infinite trees (the Harary-Schwenk-Scott conjecture from 1972) was a longstanding open problem until 2017, when a non-reconstructible tree of maximum degree 3 was found by Bowler et al.

== See also ==
- New digraph reconstruction conjecture
- Partial symmetry
