= Mazur–Ulam theorem =

Surjective isometries are affine mappings

In mathematics, the Mazur–Ulam theorem states that if $V$ and $W$ are normed spaces over R and the mapping

$$f\colon V\to W$$

is a surjective isometry, then $f$ is affine. It was proved by Stanisław Mazur and Stanisław Ulam in response to a question raised by Stefan Banach.

For strictly convex spaces the result is true, and easy, even for isometries which are not necessarily surjective. In this case, for any $u$ and $v$ in $V$, and for any $t$ in $[0,1]$, write $r=\|u-v\|_V=\|f(u)-f(v)\|_W$ and denote the closed ball of radius R around v by $\bar B(v,R)$. Then $tu+(1-t)v$ is the unique element of $\bar B(v,tr)\cap \bar B(u,(1-t)r)$, so, since $f$ is injective, $f(tu+(1-t)v)$ is the unique element of $f\bigl(\bar B(v,tr)\cap \bar B(u,(1-t)r\bigr)= f\bigl(\bar B(v,tr)\bigr)\cap f\bigl(\bar B(u,(1-t)r\bigr)=\bar B\bigl(f(v),tr\bigr)\cap\bar B\bigl(f(u),(1-t)r\bigr),$ and therefore is equal to $tf(u)+(1-t)f(v)$. Therefore $f$ is an affine map. This argument fails in the general case, because in a normed space which is not strictly convex two tangent balls may meet in some flat convex region of their boundary, not just a single point.

== See also ==
Aleksandrov–Rassias problem
