= Salpeter =

Salpeter may refer to:

== Science ==
- 11757 Salpeter, a minor planet found in 1960 by a team from Palomar Observatory
- Bethe–Salpeter equation, describes two-particle quantum field binding, derived by Hans Bethe and Edwin Salpeter
- Salpeter process, a process of nuclear fusion mathematically defined by Edwin Salpeter
- Salpeter initial mass function, an early and influential model for the distribution of the masses of stars upon formation

== People ==
- Edwin Ernest Salpeter (1924–2008), US astrophysicist
- Greta Salpeter (born 1988), US musician
- Lonah Chemtai Salpeter (born 1988), Kenyan-born Israeli Olympic runner
- Miriam Salpeter (1929—2000). US neurobiologist, wife of Edwin Ernest Salpeter

== See also ==
- Saltpeter (disambiguation)
- Pitié-Salpêtrière Hospital, a teaching hospital in Paris, France
