= EXC code =

Software package implementing the Bethe–Salpeter equation

EXC is a condensed matter physics many-body theory software package implementing the Bethe–Salpeter equation in frequency-reciprocal space and on a plane wave basis set. Its purpose is to calculate, ab initio, dielectric and optical properties, like absorption, reflectivity, refraction index, electron and X-ray energy loss, for a large variety of systems, ranging from bulk systems, surfaces, to clusters or atoms. It is distributed under the GNU/GPL license.

== See also ==
- ABINIT
- DP code
- YAMBO code
- PWscf
- Quantum chemistry computer programs
