= DP code =

DP is a free software package for physicists implementing ab initio linear-response TDDFT (time-dependent density functional theory) in frequency-reciprocal space and on a plane wave basis set. It allows to calculate both dielectric spectra, such as EELS (electron energy-loss spectroscopy), IXSS (inelastic X-ray scattering spectroscopy) and CIXS (coherent inelastic X-ray scattering spectroscopy), and also optical spectra, e.g. optical absorption, reflectivity, refraction index. The systems range from periodic/crystalline solids, to surfaces, clusters, molecules and atoms made of insulators, semiconductors and metal elements. It implements the RPA (random phase approximation), the TDLDA or ALDA (adiabatic local-density approximation) plus other non-local approximations, including or neglecting local-field effects. It is distributed under the scientific software open-source academic for free license.

== See also ==
- ABINIT
- EXC code
- YAMBO code
- PWscf
- Quantum chemistry computer programs
