= Frank Isakson Prize =

The Frank Isakson Prize for Optical Effects in Solids is a prize that has been awarded every second year by the American Physical Society since 1980. The recipient is chosen for "outstanding optical research that leads to breakthroughs in the condensed matter sciences." The prize is named after Frank Isakson, and as of 2007 it is valued at $5,000.

== Recipients ==
Source: American Physical Society

- 2026: Junichiro Kono
- 2024: Feng Wang
- 2022: Manfred Fiebig
- 2020: Robert W. Boyd and Vladimir M. Shalaev
- 2018: Andrea Cavalleri and Keith A. Nelson
- 2016: David Burnham Tanner and Dirk van der Marel
- 2014: Naomi Halas, Peter Nordlander, and Tony Heinz
- 2012: Dmitri Basov
- 2010: Duncan G. Steel
- 2008: Joseph Orenstein and Zeev Valentine Vardeny
- 2006: Roberto Merlin
- 2004: James Wolfe
- 2002: James W. Allen and Thomas Timusk
- 2000: Paul Linford Richards
- 1998: Yuen-Ron Shen
- 1996: David E. Aspnes
- 1994: Anant K. Ramdas
- 1992: Paul A. Fleury
- 1990: Miles V. Klein
- 1988: Albert J. Sievers
- 1986: Elias Burstein
- 1984: Manuel Cardona
- 1982: Jan Tauc
- 1980: David L. Dexter

== See also ==
- List of physics awards
