= Lars Hedin =

Swedish physicist (1930–2002)

- Born: Lars Tore Hedin; 4 February 1930; Örebro, Sweden
- Died: 2002 (aged 71–72)
- Education: KTH Royal Institute of Technology; Uppsala University; Chalmers University of Technology
- Known for: GW approximation Hedin equations
- Children: 3
- Scientific career
- Fields: Condensed matter physics
- Workplaces: Linköping University; Lund University; Max Planck Institute for Solid State Research
- Thesis: Application of Many-Body Theory to the One-Electron Problem of Atoms, Molecules and Solids (1965)
- Doctoral advisor: Stig Lundqvist

Lars Tore Hedin (February 4, 1930 – 2002) was a Swedish physicist working on condensed matter physics and emeritus professor of Lund University. He is known for the development of GW approximation based on the Hedin equations, named after him.

== Life ==
Lars Tore Hedin was born in Örebro, Sweden in 1930, son of engineers.

He studied undergraduate physics in KTH Royal Institute of Technology, obtaining a master's degree in 1955. He continued to work there writing a licenciate dissertation in 1960 on the elastic properties of crystals in 1960, advised by Lamek Hultén.

In 1960, he entered Uppsala University for his graduate studies, working in the group of Per-Olov Löwdin. There he became the PhD student of Stig Lundqvist working on many-body theory applied to condensed matter. Hedin earned a grant to work at Argonne National Laboratory in the United States between 1962 and 1964, going back to Sweden's Chalmers University of Technology afterwards, where Lundqvist had been awarded a professorship. Based on his work at Argonne, he wrote his thesis titled "Application of Many-Body Theory to the One-Electron Problem of Atoms, Molecules and Solids" on 30 October 1965. Hedin had developed a model in 1965 which later became known as the GW approximation, where G is the many-body Green's function and W the screened interaction term. The equations that he developed are called the Hedin equations. The GW approximation became a competitor theory for density functional theory, also developed about the same time. Due to its computational requirements, it was not until the 1980s that real materials were able to be studied using GW approximation.

Hedin work with Lundqvist at Chalmers, led to their review paper titled "Effects of Electron-electron and Electron-Phonon Interactions on the One-Electron States of Solids" in 1970 which became the foundation for most of his work. Their model became known internationally as the 'Swedish electron gas'. The same year, Hedin became professor at Linköping University, but the year afterward he accepted a professorship at Lund University where he stablished his own group. In 1994, he accepted the four year position of director of the Max Planck Institute for Solid State Research in Stuttgart, Germany. He returned to Lund University as emeritus.

Hedin used his GW method to study photoemission. He called this theory the 'blue electron theory', which he explained as

By a blue electron I understand an electron which to some degree is regarded as distinguishable from the other electrons in the medium, among which its moves. This is clearly in violation of the Pauli principle, but I will try to explore where this idea can lead.

— Correlation Effects in Atoms and Solids, paper presented at the Symposium on Frontiers in Condensed Matter Physics in honor of Stig Lundqvist, 1990 (unpublished).

Hedin also worked in X-ray absorption fine structure (XAFS), introducing the local density approximation for the GW self energy.

Hedin was editor of Solid State Communications from 1971 to 1990.

=== Personal life ===
He married his wife Hillevi in 1953. They had three daughters.
