= Aron Pinczuk =

Argentine-American condensed matter physicist (1939–2022)

Aron Pinczuk (February 15, 1939 – February 13, 2022) was an Argentine-American experimental condensed matter physicist who was professor of physics and professor of applied physics at Columbia University. He was known for his work on correlated electronic states in two dimensional systems using photoluminescence and resonant inelastic light scattering methods. He was a fellow of the American Physical Society, the American Association for the Advancement of Science and the American Academy of Arts and Sciences.

== Education and career ==
Pinczuk was born in Buenos Aires, Argentina, in 1939. He received Licenciado in physics from the University of Buenos Aires, Argentina in April 1962 and Ph.D in physics from the University of Pennsylvania, in January 1969. He became an assistant professor of physics there after graduation. From 1970 to 1976 he was a member of the National Research Council and National Atomic Energy Commission in Buenos Aires, Argentina. During this time, he was a faculty member in the department of physics at the University of Buenos Aires between 1973 and 1974. He visited the Max Planck Institut für Festkörperforschung in Stuttgart, Germany from 1975 to 1976.

Later, he headed back to United States and worked as a visiting scientist at IBM Research in Yorktown Heights until 1977. From 1978 to 2008, he was a member at Bell Laboratories, Holmdel, NJ and Murray Hill, NJ (later renamed AT&T Bell Laboratories and then Lucent Technologies). Since 1998, he became joint professor in the department of physics and the department of applied physics and applied mathematics at Columbia University in New York, where he was also a member of the Columbia Nano Initiative.

== Research ==
Pinczuk employed spectroscopy to study electron systems in semiconductors and insulators. He was a leader in the field of photoluminescence and resonant light scattering from solids. He studied interacting quantum fluids in semiconductor quantum well heterostructures, with a focus on excitations in quantum Hall phases. Pinczuk also applied Raman scattering to study phonons in graphene and later explored the engineering of electron states in semiconductor artificial graphene using advanced nanofabrication technology.

In 1979, using resonant inelastic light scattering, Pinczuk and his colleagues made the first observation of intersubband excitations in the two dimensional electron systems of Gallium Arsenide (GaAs) heterostructures.

In 1989, Pinczuk et al. distinguished intersubband spin density excitations from single particle excitations and showed that exchange Coulomb interactions in the two dimensional electron gas of GaAs microstructures were more important than previously anticipated.

In 1993, Pinczuk and his colleagues observed long-wavelength collective excitation of the fractional quantum Hall state for the first time. The resonant inelastic light scattering technique, remains one of the few methods that can directly access neutral excitations of electrons in semiconductor microstructures.

Later, Pinczuk contributed to the understanding of low-lying neutral spin-conserving and spin-flip excitations of the fractional quantum Hall fluids.

Pinczuk's association with the journal Solid State Communications began in July 1989, when he joined the board of editors under founding editor Elias Burstein (who was his doctoral advisor). He was later promoted to associate editor-in-chief, working alongside Manuel Cardona. Pinczuk became chief editor of the journal in December 2004, and served through 2019.

== Honors and awards ==
Pinczuk was elected a fellow of the American Physical Society in 1987 "for his pioneering work on the application of light-scattering to study the properties of two-dimensional electron systems." He was awarded the Oliver E. Buckley Prize for Condensed Matter Physics in 1994. He was named a fellow of American Association for the Advancement of Science in 2001 and a fellow of the American Academy of Arts and Sciences in 2009.

== Selected publications ==
=== Articles ===
- Smith, J. E.; Brodsky, M. H.; Crowder, B. L.; Nathan, M. I.; Pinczuk, A. (1971). "Raman Spectra of Amorphous Si and Related Tetrahedrally Bonded Semiconductors". Physical Review Letters. 26 (11): 642–646. Bibcode:1971PhRvL..26..642S. doi:10.1103/PhysRevLett.26.642.
- Shah, Jagdeep; Pinczuk, A.; Gossard, A. C.; Wiegmann, W. (1985). "Energy-Loss Rates for Hot Electrons and Holes in Ga As Quantum Wells". Physical Review Letters. 54 (18): 2045–2048. Bibcode:1985PhRvL..54.2045S. doi:10.1103/PhysRevLett.54.2045. PMID 10031209.
- Goñi, A. R.; Pinczuk, A.; Weiner, J. S.; Calleja, J. M.; Dennis, B. S.; Pfeiffer, L. N.; West, K. W. (1991). "One-dimensional plasmon dispersion and dispersionless intersubband excitations in Ga As quantum wires". Physical Review Letters. 67 (23): 3298–3301. Bibcode:1991PhRvL..67.3298G. doi:10.1103/PhysRevLett.67.3298. PMID 10044697.
- Nurmikko, Arto; Pinczuk, Aron (1993). "Optical Probes in the Quantum Hall Regime". Physics Today. 46 (6): 24–32. Bibcode:1993PhT....46f..24N. doi:10.1063/1.881352.
- Wegscheider, W.; Pfeiffer, L. N.; Dignam, M. M.; Pinczuk, A.; West, K. W.; McCall, S. L.; Hull, R. (1993). "Lasing from excitons in quantum wires". Physical Review Letters. 71 (24): 4071–4074. Bibcode:1993PhRvL..71.4071W. doi:10.1103/PhysRevLett.71.4071. PMID 10055146.
- Anastassakis, E.; Pinczuk, A.; Burstein, E.; Pollak, F.H.; Cardona, M. (1993). "Effect of static uniaxial stress on the Raman spectrum of silicon". Solid State Communications. 88 (11–12): 1053–1058. Bibcode:1993SSCom..88.1053A. doi:10.1016/0038-1098(93)90294-W.
- Yan, Jun; Zhang, Yuanbo; Kim, Philip; Pinczuk, Aron (2007). "Electric Field Effect Tuning of Electron-Phonon Coupling in Graphene". Physical Review Letters. 98 (16) 166802. arXiv:cond-mat/0612634. Bibcode:2007PhRvL..98p6802Y. doi:10.1103/PhysRevLett.98.166802. PMID 17501446. S2CID 3336551.
- Gibertini, Marco; Singha, Achintya; Pellegrini, Vittorio; Polini, Marco; Vignale, Giovanni; Pinczuk, Aron; Pfeiffer, Loren N.; West, Ken W. (2009). "Engineering artificial graphene in a two-dimensional electron gas". Physical Review B. 79 (24) 241406. arXiv:0904.4191. Bibcode:2009PhRvB..79x1406G. doi:10.1103/PhysRevB.79.241406. S2CID 119238510.
- Zhao, Liuyan; He, Rui; Rim, Kwang Taeg; Schiros, Theanne; Kim, Keun Soo; Zhou, Hui; Gutiérrez, Christopher; Chockalingam, S. P.; Arguello, Carlos J.; Pálová, Lucia; Nordlund, Dennis; Hybertsen, Mark S.; Reichman, David R.; Heinz, Tony F.; Kim, Philip; Pinczuk, Aron; Flynn, George W.; Pasupathy, Abhay N. (2011). "Visualizing Individual Nitrogen Dopants in Monolayer Graphene". Science. 333 (6045): 999–1003. arXiv:1108.4026. Bibcode:2011Sci...333..999Z. doi:10.1126/science.1208759. PMID 21852495. S2CID 14719674.

=== Books ===
- Lockwood, David J.; Pinczuk, Aron, eds. (6 December 2012). Optical Phenomena in Semiconductor Structures of Reduced Dimensions. Springer. ISBN 978-94-011-1912-2. 1st edition. Dordrecht: Kluwer. 1993. ISBN 0-7923-2512-5.
- Das Sarma, Sankar; Pinczuk, Aron, eds. (11 July 2008). Perspectives in Quantum Hall Effects: Novel Quantum Liquids in Low-Dimensional Semiconductor Structures. John Wiley & Sons. ISBN 978-3-527-61726-5. Sarma, Sankar Das; Pinczuk, Aron (1996). 1st edition. Wiley. ISBN 0-471-11216-X.
