= Peter Nordlander =

Swedish physicist

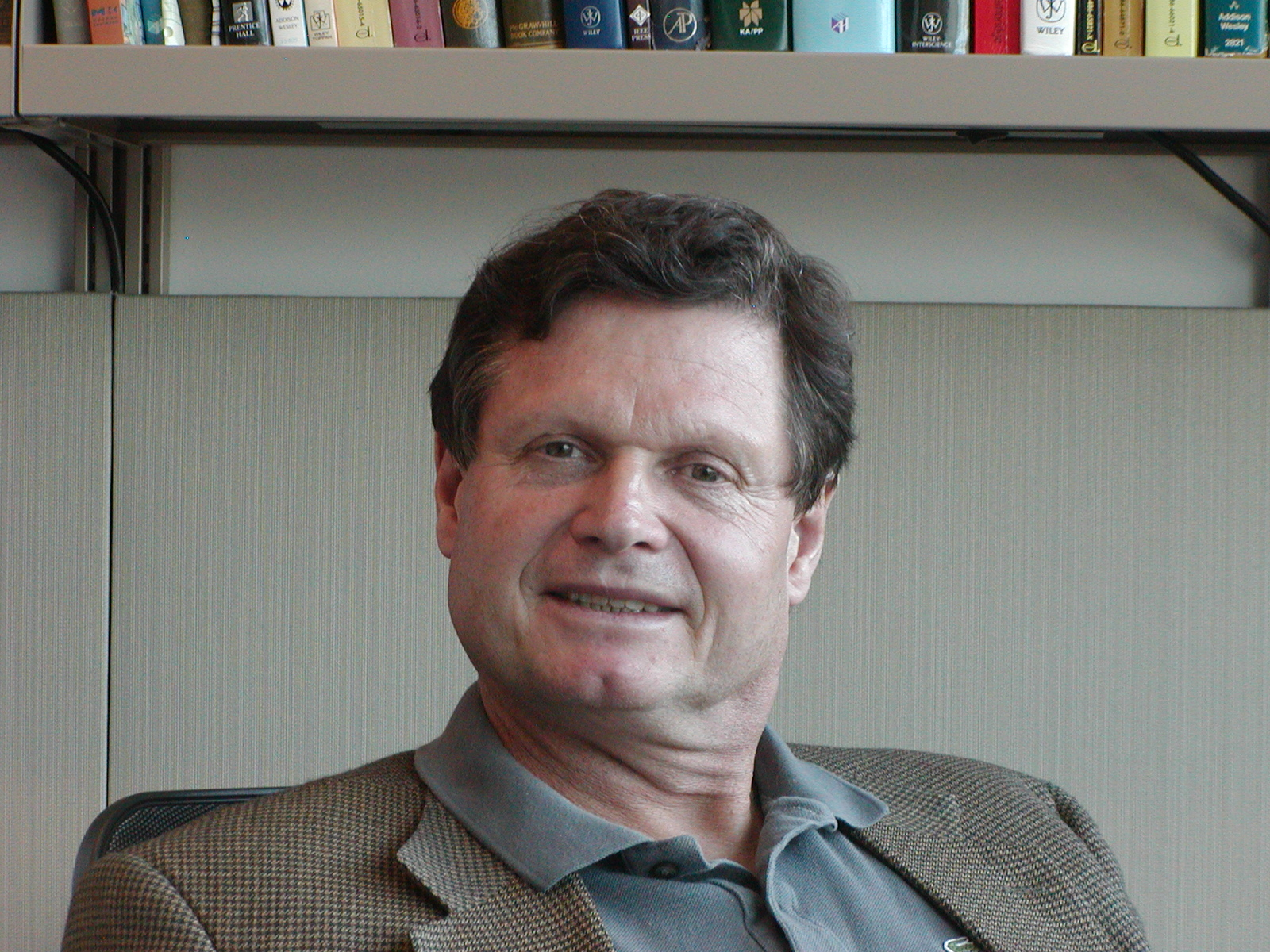
- Peter Nordlander in 2001
- Occupation: Physicist

Peter J. Nordlander is a Swedish physicist.

== Career ==
Nordlander completed a doctorate in theoretical physics at Chalmers University of Technology. Following postdoctoral research at Thomas J. Watson Research Center, Bell Labs, and Rutgers University, Nordlander began teaching at Rice University in 1989. He works within the Laboratory for Nanophotonics at Rice, and serves as the Wiess Chair and Professor of Physics and Astronomy.

== Research ==
Nordlander's research focuses on theoretical nanophotonics and plasmonics. He has collaborated extensively with Naomi Halas at Rice University on the development of plasmonic nanostructures and their applications in optics, sensing, and catalysis.

Together with Halas and then-student Emil Prodan (now Professor of Physics at Yeshiva University), Nordlander developed the Plasmon Hybridization model. This theory explains the plasmonic properties of nanoparticles of complex shapes in terms of interacting primitive plasmon modes.

His group has investigated plasmonic nanocavities, nanoparticle dimers, and active optical antennas. These studies revealed symmetry-breaking effects, Fano resonances, and quantum plasmonic behaviors in metallic nanostructures.

== Recognition ==
Nordlander was elected to fellowship of the American Physical Society in 2002 "for pioneering contributions to the chemical physics of atom-surface interactions, including the development of a many-body theoretical description of charge transfer processes in atom-surface scattering." He is also a fellow of SPIE, the American Association for the Advancement of Science and the Optical Society. Nordlander was one of three recipients of the Willis E. Lamb Award in 2013, "for pioneering theoretical contributions in the field of plasmonics" alongside Shaul Mukamel and Susanne Yelin. Nordlander, Naomi Halas, and Tony Heinz won the 2014 Frank Isakson Prize for Optical Effects in Solids awarded by the American Physical Society. Nordlander and Halas shared a second award in 2015, the Optical Society's R. W. Wood Prize. In 2016, Nordlander was listed an ISI highly cited researcher.
