= David Tanner =

David Tanner may refer to:

- David Tanner (cyclist) (born 1984), Australian road cyclist
- Sir David Tanner (rowing) (born 1947), performance director for the British Rowing Team
- David B. Tanner (born 1945), American physicist
