= Maris–Tandy model =

Model of the strong nuclear force

Within the Schwinger-Dyson equation approach to calculate structure of bound states under quantum field theory dynamics, one applies truncation schemes such that the finite tower of integral equations for Green's functions becomes manageable. For hadrons (mesons and baryons) as relativistic bound states of quarks and gluons interacting via the strong nuclear force, a well-adopted scheme is the rainbow-ladder truncation. Particularly the bound state amplitude (Bethe-Salpeter amplitude) of mesons is determined from the homogeneous Bethe-Salpeter equation. While the amplitude for baryons is solved from the Faddeev equation. Information on the structure of hadrons is contained within these amplitudes. The established quantum field theory of the strong interaction is quantum chromodynamics (QCD). The Maris–Tandy model is a practical case of the rainbow-ladder truncation that yields reasonable description for hadrons with up quarks, down quarks, and strange quarks as their valence quarks.

== Description of the model ==
Within the Maris–Tandy model of QCD interactions for quarks and gluons, the quark-gluon proper vertex $\Gamma_{\mu}(k,p)$ in combination with the dressed gluon propagator $G^{\mu \nu}(q)$ in the Landau gauge is replaced by the bare vertex multiplied by a scalar dressing function:

$$\Gamma_{\mu}(k,p)\, G^{\mu \nu}(q) = \gamma_{\mu} \left( q^{\mu\nu} - q^{\mu} q^{\nu} / q^2 \right)\, \mathcal{G}(q^2),$$

where $k^\mu$, $p^\mu$, and $q^\mu$ are the momenta of the quarks and the gluon in Euclidean space. The matrix $\gamma^\mu$ is the Dirac matrix. And the scalar function $\mathcal{G}(q^2)$ is given by

$$g^2\, \mathcal{G}(q^2) = \dfrac{4\pi^2}{\omega^6} d_{\mathrm{IR}} q^2 e^{ - q^2 / \omega^2} +
\dfrac{4\pi^2 \gamma_{m}}{ \ln \left[ e^2 - 1 + \left( 1 + q^2 / \Lambda_{\mathrm{QCD}} \right)^2  \right] } \dfrac{ 1 - e^{ -q^2 / (4m^2_{\mathrm{t}} ) } }{ q^2 }.$$
The parameters $d_{\mathrm{IR}}$ and $\omega$ specify the strength and the scale of the infrared term, respectively. The elementary color charge is given by $g$. The second term on the right-hand side is the ultraviolet (UV) term constructed in agreement with perturbative QCD, within which the parameter $\Lambda_{\mathrm{QCD}}$ is the characteristic scale of QCD, Other parameters in the UV term are explained in Ref.

== Applications ==
The Maris–Tandy model can be applied to solve for the structure of pions, kaons, and a selection of vector mesons from the homogeneous Bethe-Salpeter equation. It can also be used to solve for the quark-photon vertex from the inhomogeneous Bethe-Salpeter equation, for the elastic form factors of pseudoscalar mesons, and for the radiative transitions of mesons. Meanwhile the mass spectrum and structure of nucleons can be solved within this model from the Faddeev equation.
