= Jun'ichirō =

- Gender: Male

Origin
- Origin: Japanese
- Meaning: Different meanings depending on the kanji used

Jun'ichirō, Junichirō, Junichiro or Junichirou (written: 純一郎 or 潤一郎) is a masculine Japanese given name. Notable people with the name include:

- Junichiro Itani (伊谷 純一郎; 1926–2001), Japanese primatologist
- Junichiro Ito (伊藤 順一郎; born 1954), Japanese medical researcher and psychiatrist
- Junichiro Koizumi (小泉 純一郎; born 1942), Japanese politician and Prime Minister of Japan
- Junichiro Kono, Japanese-American electrical and computer engineer
- Jun'ichirō Tanizaki (谷崎 潤一郎; 1886–1965), Japanese writer
- Junichiro Yasui (安井 潤一郎; born 1950), Japanese politician
