= François Peeters =

François M. Peeters is a Belgian physicist.

Peeters obtained his doctorate at the University of Antwerp and completed postdoctoral research at Bell Laboratories and Bellcore. He subsequently returned to Belgium and joined the Antwerp faculty. In 2005, Peeters was elected a fellow of the American Physical Society, which recognized him "[f]or his sustained, important contributions to theoretical solid state physics, in particular to the areas of mesoscopic superconductivity and nanostructured semiconductors." Peeters' election as a member of Academia Europaea took place in 2010. In 2020, Peeters succeeded Aron Pinczuk as editor-in-chief of the journal Solid State Communications.
