= Projector augmented wave method =

Solid state physics calculation technique

The projector augmented wave method (PAW) is a technique used in ab initio electronic structure calculations. It is a generalization of the pseudopotential and linear augmented-plane-wave methods, and allows for density functional theory calculations to be performed with greater computational efficiency.

Valence wavefunctions tend to have rapid oscillations near ion cores due to the requirement that they be orthogonal to core states; this situation is problematic because it requires many Fourier components (or in the case of grid-based methods, a very fine mesh) to describe the wavefunctions accurately. The PAW approach addresses this issue by transforming these rapidly oscillating wavefunctions into smooth wavefunctions which are more computationally convenient, and provides a way to calculate all-electron properties from these smooth wavefunctions. This approach is somewhat reminiscent of a change from the Schrödinger picture to the Heisenberg picture.

== Transforming the wavefunction ==
The linear transformation $\mathcal{T}$ transforms the fictitious pseudo wavefunction $|\tilde{\Psi}\rangle$ to the all-electron wavefunction $|\Psi\rangle$:

$$|\Psi\rangle=\mathcal{T}|\tilde{\Psi}\rangle$$

Note that the "all-electron" wavefunction is a Kohn–Sham single particle wavefunction, and should not be confused with the many-body wavefunction. In order to have $|\tilde{\Psi}\rangle$ and $|\Psi\rangle$ differ only in the regions near the ion cores, we write

$$\mathcal{T}=1+\sum_R\hat{\mathcal{T}}_R$$,

where $\hat{\mathcal{T}}_R$ is non-zero only within some spherical augmentation region $\Omega_R$ enclosing atom $R$.

Around each atom, it is useful to expand the pseudo wavefunction into pseudo partial waves:

$|\tilde{\Psi}\rangle=\sum_i|\tilde{\phi}_i\rangle c_i$ within $\Omega_R$.

Because the operator $\mathcal{T}$ is linear, the coefficients $c_i$ can be written as an inner product with a set of so-called projector functions, $|p_i\rangle$:

$$c_i=\langle p_i|\tilde{\Psi}\rangle$$

where $\langle p_i|\tilde{\phi}_j\rangle=\delta_{ij}$. The all-electron partial waves, $|\phi_i\rangle=\mathcal{T}|\tilde{\phi}_i\rangle$, are typically chosen to be solutions to the Kohn–Sham Schrödinger equation for an isolated atom. The transformation $\mathcal{T}$ is thus specified by three quantities:

1. a set of all-electron partial waves $|\phi_i\rangle$
2. a set of pseudo partial waves $|\tilde{\phi}_i\rangle$
3. a set of projector functions $|p_i\rangle$

and we can explicitly write it down as

$$\mathcal{T} = 1 + \sum_i \left( | \phi_i \rangle - | \tilde{\phi}_i \rangle \right) \langle p_i |$$

Outside the augmentation regions, the pseudo partial waves are equal to the all-electron partial waves. Inside the spheres, they can be any smooth continuation, such as a linear combination of polynomials or Bessel functions.

The PAW method is typically combined with the frozen core approximation, in which the core states are assumed to be unaffected by the ion's environment. There are several online repositories of pre-computed atomic PAW data.

== Transforming operators ==
The PAW transformation allows all-electron observables to be calculated using the pseudo-wavefunction from a pseudopotential calculation, conveniently avoiding having to ever represent the all-electron wavefunction explicitly in memory. This is particularly important for the calculation of properties such as NMR, which strongly depend on the form of the wavefunction near the nucleus. Starting with the definition of the expectation value of an operator:

$$a_i = \langle \Psi | \hat{A} | \Psi \rangle$$,

where you can substitute in the pseudo wavefunction as you know $|\Psi\rangle=\mathcal{T}|\tilde{\Psi}\rangle$:

$$a_i = \langle \tilde{\Psi} | \mathcal{T}^\dagger \hat{A} \mathcal{T} | \tilde{\Psi} \rangle$$,

from which you can define the pseudo operator, indicated by a tilde:

$$\tilde{A} = \mathcal{T}^\dagger \hat{A} \mathcal{T}$$.

If the operator $\hat{A}$ is local and well-behaved we can expand this using the definition of $\mathcal{T}$ to give the PAW operator transform

$$\tilde{A} = \hat{A} + \sum_{i,j} | p_i \rangle \left( \langle \phi_i | \hat{A} | \phi_j \rangle - \langle \tilde{\phi}_i | \hat{A} |\tilde{\phi}_j \rangle \right) \langle p_j |$$.

where the indices $i,j$ run over all projectors on all atoms. Usually only indices on the same atom are summed over, i.e. off-site contributions are ignored, and this is called the "on-site approximation".

In the original paper, Blöchl notes that there is a degree of freedom in this equation for an arbitrary operator $\hat{B}$, that is localised inside the spherical augmentation region, to add a term of the form:

$$\hat{B} - \sum_{i,j} | p_i \rangle \langle \tilde{\phi}_i | \hat{B} |\tilde{\phi}_j \rangle \langle p_j |$$,

which can be seen as the basis for implementation of pseudopotentials within PAW, as the nuclear coulomb potential can now be substituted with a smoother one.

== Software implementing the projector augmented-wave method ==
- ABINIT
- CASTEP (to calculate NMR properties)
- CP2K (in form of their Gaussian and Augmented Plane Wave (GAPW) Method)
- CP-PAW
- GPAW
- ONETEP
- PWPAW
- S/PHI/nX
- Quantum ESPRESSO
- VASP
