= Wang Feng =

Wang Feng may refer to:

- Wang Feng (diver) (born 1979), Chinese diver
- Wang Feng (canoeist) (born 1985), female Chinese flatwater canoer
- Wang Feng (politician) (1910–1998), secretary of the Xinjiang Uygur Autonomous Regional Committee of the Chinese Communist Party, and chairman of Xinjiang
- Wang Feng (singer) (born 1971), Chinese singer-songwriter
- Wang Feng (mnemonist) (born 1990), 2010 and 2011 World Memory Champion
- Wang Feng (footballer) (born 1956), Chinese footballer
- Feng Wang (physicist), American physicist
