= Naomi Halas =

American chemist and electrical engineer

- Citizenship: United States
- Education: La Salle University, Bryn Mawr College
- Known for: Core-shell nanoparticles with tunable plasmonic resonances
- Awards: DoD Cancer Innovator, Julius Edgar Lilienfeld Prize, Willis E. Lamb Award, Weizmann Women in Science Award, R. W. Wood Prize, SPIE Biophotonics Technology Innovator Award, Frank Isakson Prize for Optical Effects in Solids
- Scientific career
- Fields: Photonics, Plasmonics, Nanophotonics, Nanotechnology
- Workplaces: IBM Thomas J. Watson Research Center, AT&T Bell Laboratories, Rice University,
- Thesis: (1987)
- Website: http://halas.rice.edu/halas-bio

Naomi J. Halas is an American physicist and nano scientist. She is University Professor at Rice University and the Stanley C. Moore Professor of Electrical and Computer Engineering. She is also the founding director of Rice University Laboratory for Nanophotonics, and the Smalley-Curl Institute. She invented the first nanoparticle with tunable plasmonic resonances, which are controlled by their shape and structure, and has won numerous awards for her pioneering work in the field of nanophotonics and plasmonics. She was also part of a team that developed the first dark pulse soliton in 1987 while working for IBM.

Halas was elected a member of the National Academy of Engineering in 2014 for nanoscale engineering of optical resonances and lineshapes.

She is a Fellow of Optica, the American Physical Society, the International Society for Optical Engineering (SPIE), the Institute of Electrical and Electronics Engineers (IEEE), the American Association for the Advancement of Science. In 2019, she was named a fellow of the Royal Society of Chemistry.

Halas was elected a member of the American Academy of Arts and Sciences in 2009, the National Academy of Sciences in 2013, and the National Academy of Engineering in 2014, the latter for nanoscale engineering of optical resonances and lineshapes. She was elected to the Royal Danish Academy of Sciences and Letters in 2024.

== Education ==
Halas received her bachelor's degree from La Salle University in 1980. She obtained her master's degree from Bryn Mawr College in 1984 and her doctorate from Bryn Mawr in 1987. She was a graduate research fellow at the IBM Thomas J Watson Research Center during her doctoral studies, during which time she developed the first "dark pulse" soliton with Dieter Kroekel, Giampiero Giuliani and Daniel Grischkowsky. A "dark pulse" soliton is a standing wave that propagates through an optical fiber without spreading and which consists of a short interruption of a light pulse. She was also part of the first research efforts focusing on time-domain terahertz spectroscopy during her time at IBM.

== Career ==
Halas conducted her graduate research at the IBM Thomas J. Watson Research Center in Yorktown Heights, New York in the mid-1980s where she worked on ultrafast nonlinear optics and early developments in terahertz spectroscopy. She subsequently held a postdoctoral appointment at AT&T Bell Laboratories, where her research focused on time-resolved photoemission spectroscopy of semiconductor surfaces.

Halas joined the faculty of Rice University in 1989. Her initial appointment was in the Department of Electrical and Computer Engineering.

In 1999 she was appointed professor in electrical and computer engineering and chemistry, and in 2001 she was named the Stanley C. Moore Professor in Electrical and Computer Engineering.

In 2004 Halas founded and became director of Rice University’s Laboratory for Nanophotonics, an interdisciplinary research center devoted to the study of light–matter interactions at the nanoscale and their technological applications. She also served as director of the Smalley-Curl Institute.

In 2023 she was named University Professor at Rice University, the institution’s highest faculty rank. She became only the tenth person and second woman in the university’s history to receive this title.

== Research ==
Halas is widely recognized for foundational contributions to plasmonics and nanophotonics, particularly the development of tunable plasmonic nanostructures and their application to medicine, sensing, and energy conversion. Her research integrates fundamental physics and chemistry with electromagnetics, nanoscale materials design, and applied photonics technologies.

=== Nanoshells and tunable plasmonic nanostructures ===
Halas is known for inventing plasmon-resonant nanoshells, a class of core–shell nanoparticles consisting of a dielectric core (typically silica) coated with a thin metallic shell, usually gold or silver. These structures support surface plasmon resonances whose optical response can be precisely controlled by adjusting the relative dimensions of the nanoparticle core and shell.

Her realization of nanoshells demonstrated that optical absorption and scattering could be engineered across a broad spectral range from the visible to the infrared, enabling systematic tuning of light–matter interactions at the nanoscale. This capability provided the first practical implementation of tunable plasmon-resonant nanoparticles, translating theoretical predictions into experimentally controllable optical materials.

In 2003, Halas and her colleague Jennifer L. West were awarded the Nanotechnology Now Best Discovery Award for their groundbreaking work to develop a cancer therapy based on metallic nanoshells. Halas also received the Innovator Award from the US Department of Defense Congressionally Directed Breast Cancer Research Program, and was awarded a four-year $3 million grant to conduct further research into the treatment.

=== Plasmon hybridization and coupled nanostructures ===
Halas has worked on understanding how plasmonic structures interact when brought together. Her research helped advance the concept of plasmon hybridization, developed with her collaborator Peter Nordlander. This model compares interacting plasmons in metallic nanostructures to molecular orbitals, showing how their electromagnetic modes combine to form new resonant states.

The framework explains how factors such as geometry, spacing, and material composition influence optical behavior in nanoparticle assemblies. It has been applied to systems including clusters, nanogaps, and arrays, and has informed the design of tunable plasmonic devices and spectroscopic tools.

=== Surface-enhanced spectroscopy and sensing ===
Halas has developed plasmonic nanostructures for sensitive molecular detection. Nanoshells and related designs can greatly amplify electromagnetic fields, enhancing signals in Raman and infrared spectroscopy. These effects allow detection of very small amounts of material and support optical nanosensors for identifying chemicals, biomolecules, and environmental toxins.

=== Photothermal therapy ===
Her initial studies in photothermal cancer therapy were collaborations with bioengineer Professor Jennifer West. They co-founded a company, Nanospectra Biosciences, which transitioned photothermal cancer therapy into successful clinical trials for prostate cancer.

=== Plasmonic photocatalysis and solar-driven processes ===
Halas has studied the use of plasmonic nanostructures to drive chemical reactions with light. By concentrating electromagnetic energy and generating energetic charge carriers, these materials can enable catalytic processes without conventional heating.

Her work showed that reactions such as ammonia cracking and methane reforming can be driven by light. A key concept is the “antenna–reactor” nanoparticle, which combines plasmonic structures with catalytic sites.

This research also contributed to the founding of Syzygy Plasmonics, which develops light-driven chemical reactors operating at lower temperatures.

== Awards and honors ==
- 2026 Hill Prize in Engineering (Lyda Hill Philanthropies)
- 2025 Franklin Medal in Chemistry
- 2024 C.E.K. Mees Medal
- 2024 Geoffrey Frew Fellowship, Australian Academy of Science
- 2021 Doctor of Science honoris causa, Université de technologie de Troyes
- 2019 Fellow, Royal Society of Chemistry
- 2019 American Chemical Society Nano Lectureship Award
- 2019 Highly Cited Researcher, Clarivate (Materials Science)
- 2019 Spiers Memorial Award, Royal Society of Chemistry
- 2019 American Chemical Society Award in Colloid Chemistry
- 2018 Julius Edgar Lilienfeld Prize
- 2017 Willis E. Lamb Award
- 2017 Weizmann Women and Science Award
- 2016 C. N. Yang Professorship, Hong Kong University
- 2016 Fellow, National Academy of Inventors
- 2016 Inductee, Bethel Park High School Distinguished Alumni Hall of Fame
- 2015 R. W. Wood Prize, Optica
- 2014 SPIE Biophotonics Technology Innovator Award
- 2014 Frank Isakson Prize for Optical Effects in Solids, American Physical Society
- 2012 Doctor of Science honoris causa, University of Victoria, Canada
- 2012 Alexander M. Cruickshank Award, Gordon Research Conferences
- 2010 R. E. Tressler Award, Materials Science and Engineering, Penn State University
- 2007 Doctor of Science honoris causa, La Salle University
- 2003 Nanotechnology Now Best Discovery Award

She has been elected to the National Academy of Sciences (2013), National Academy of Engineering (2014), National Academy of Inventors (2015), American Association for the Advancement of Science (2005), and American Academy of Arts and Sciences (2009). She is a fellow of the American Physical Society (2001), Optica (2003), SPIE (2007), the Institute of Electrical and Electronics Engineers (2008), and the Materials Research Society (2013).

== Selected publications ==
- Le, F.; Brandl, D.W.; Y. A. Urzhumov, Y. A.; et al. (2008). “Metallic nanoparticle arrays: a common substrate for both SERS and SEIRA”. ACS Nano. 2: 707-718.
- Knight, M. W.; Sobhani, H.; Nordlander, P.; and Halas, N. J. (2011). “Photodetection with active optical antennas”. Science. 332: 702-704.
- L R Hirsch; R J Stafford; J A Bankson; et al. (2003). "Nanoshell-mediated near-infrared thermal therapy of tumors under magnetic resonance guidance". Proceedings of the National Academy of Sciences of the United States of America. 100 (23): 13549–13554. Bibcode:2003PNAS..10013549H. doi:10.1073/pnas.2232479100. PMC 263851. PMID 14597719. Wikidata Q37089559.
- Prodan, Emil; C. Radloff; Halas, Naomi; Nordlander, Peter (2003). "A hybridization model for the plasmon response of complex nanostructures". Science. 302 (5644): 419–422. Bibcode:2003Sci...302..419P. doi:10.1126/science.1089171. PMID 14564001. Wikidata Q79176466.
- Halas, Naomi; Surbhi Lal; Wei-Shun Chang; Link, Stephan; Nordlander, Peter (2011). "Plasmons in strongly coupled metallic nanostructures". Chemical Reviews. 111 (6): 3913–3961. doi:10.1021/cr200061k. PMID 21542636. Wikidata Q84034991.
- Swearer, Dayne F.; Hangqi Zhao, Hangqi; Zhou, Linan; et al. (2016). “Heterometallic Antenna-Reactor Complexes for Photocatalysis”. Proceedings of the National Academy of Sciences of the United States of America. 113: 8916–8920.
- Zhou, L.; Swearer, Dayne F.; Zhang, Chao; et al. (2018). “Quantifying Hot carrier and Thermal Contributions in Plasmonic Photocatalysis”. Science. 362: 69–72.
- Rastinehad, Ardeshir R.; Anastos, Harry; Wajswol, Ethan; et al. (2019). “Gold Nanoshell-Localized Photothermal Ablation of Prostate Tumors in a Clinical Pilot Device Study”. Proceedings of the National Academy of Sciences of the United States of America. 116: 18590-18596.
- Zhou, Linan; Martirez, John Mark P.; Zhang, Chao; et al. (2020). “Light-driven methane dry reforming with single atomic site antenna-reactor plasmonic photocatalysts”, Nature Energy. 5: 61-70.
