= Jennifer L. West =

American bioengineer

Jennifer West
- Education: Massachusetts Institute of Technology (BS); University of Texas, Austin (MS, PhD)

Jennifer L. West is an American bioengineer. She is the current dean of engineering and applied science at the University of Virginia. She was the Fitzpatrick University Professor of Biomedical Engineering at Duke University from 2012 to 2021. In 2000, West cofounded Nanospectra Biosciences in Houston to develop a cancer therapy based on gold nanoparticles that destroy tumor cells and has been listed by MIT Technology Review as one of the 100 most innovative young scientists and engineers worldwide.

== Early life and education ==
West graduated from the Massachusetts Institute of Technology in 1992 and completed her PhD at the University of Texas at Austin.

== Career ==
=== Rice University ===
West joined the faculty at Rice University after receiving her doctoral degree from the University of Texas–Austin in 1996. As an associate professor in bioengineering and chemical engineering, West was awarded the 2002 Julia Mile Chance Prize for Excellence in Teaching. The following year, she was again recognized for her academic achievement with the 2003 Charles W. Duncan Jr. Achievement Award for Outstanding Faculty and listed by the MIT Technology Review as one of the 100 most innovative young scientists and engineers world wide.

During her tenure at Rice, West worked in the areas of gene therapy, biomaterials and tissue engineering alongside Naomi Halas. In 2000, Halas and West co-founded Nanospectra Biosciences in Houston to develop a cancer therapy based on gold nanoparticles that destroy tumor cells. They were co-recipients of the Best Discovery of 2003 Award from Nanotechnology Now for their "groundbreaking work to develop a cancer therapy based on metallic nanoshells." West and Halas were later honored by the YMCA as 2005 Outstanding Women of Achievement in Science and Technology. They followed up their nanoshells research in 2005 by developing a new approach to fighting cancer through targeted nanoparticles. The pair then developed a small beacon that was programmed to light up only when activated by specific proteases.

As a result of her academic accomplishments, West earned a grant from the Howard Hughes Medical Institute to "develop national model programs that infuse undergraduate teaching with cutting-edge research." She was also appointed chair of the Department of Bioengineering while continuing to serve as the Isabel C. Cameron Professor of Bioengineering and director of Rice’s Institute of Biosciences and Bioengineering. In 2009, West and her colleagues at the Texas Medical Center were asked to create a putty-like material that can be packed around broken bones on the battlefield to reduce complications from compound fractures. David Leebron praised West as "a scholar and researcher, one who pushes the limits of knowledge and discovery in the lab while always remaining focused on the purpose and potential of her scientific discoveries to improve our lives." For her overall "pioneering research in biomaterials engineering and advancing the fields of tissue engineering and bionanotechnology," West was the recipient of an O’Donnell Award and State Bar Inventors of the Year.

Using a grant from the National Institutes of Health for an investigation into neurovascular tissue regeneration in 2011, West and researchers at the Baylor College of Medicine found they could regenerate tissue in parts of the brain when it dies and withers after a stroke. In 2012, West received numerous accolades for her work including the Frank Annunzio Award, Duncan Award for Outstanding Academic Achievement, Admiral of the Texas Navy, Hershel M. Rich Invention Award, and CAREER Award. She was also elected a Fellow of the American Institute for Medical and Biological Engineering and Biomedical Engineering Society.

=== Duke University ===
In 2013, West left Rice University to accept a position as the Fitzpatrick Family University Professor of Engineering at the Duke University (Duke). Prior to accepting the appointment, Duke sent architects to Rice so they could design a facility that could properly house her and her research group. During her first year in this role, her research team discovered that they could destroy soft-tissue tumors by injecting gold-covered nanoshells. Following this, she improved on her design by adding an extremely thin layer of hydrogels to the surface that, when heated, lose their water content and release any molecules trapped within.

West and her colleagues created the Retroject RJT1125 in 2014, a device that stabilizes the eyeball and allows a glaucoma drug to be injected into the veins near the iris. Afterwards, she began using nanoparticles to make the injection last longer. Two years later, West was elected to the National Academy of Engineering for "developments in photothermal and theranostic therapies and bioabsorbed scaffolds for tissue regeneration." In December 2016, West was elected a Fellow of the National Academy of Inventors for "translating this scholarship in tangible ways to positively influence medicine."

== Scientific achievements ==
In 2015, West received the Clemson Award from the Society for Biomaterials, which is bestowed upon those who have advanced knowledge of material/tissue interactions. In 2017, she was invited as a lecturer at the annual meeting of the President's Circle, an honorary association that engages with the presidents of the National Academies of Science, Engineering, and Medicine to ensure they have all the necessary resources to further their work.
