= Elias Burstein =

American physicist (1917–2017)

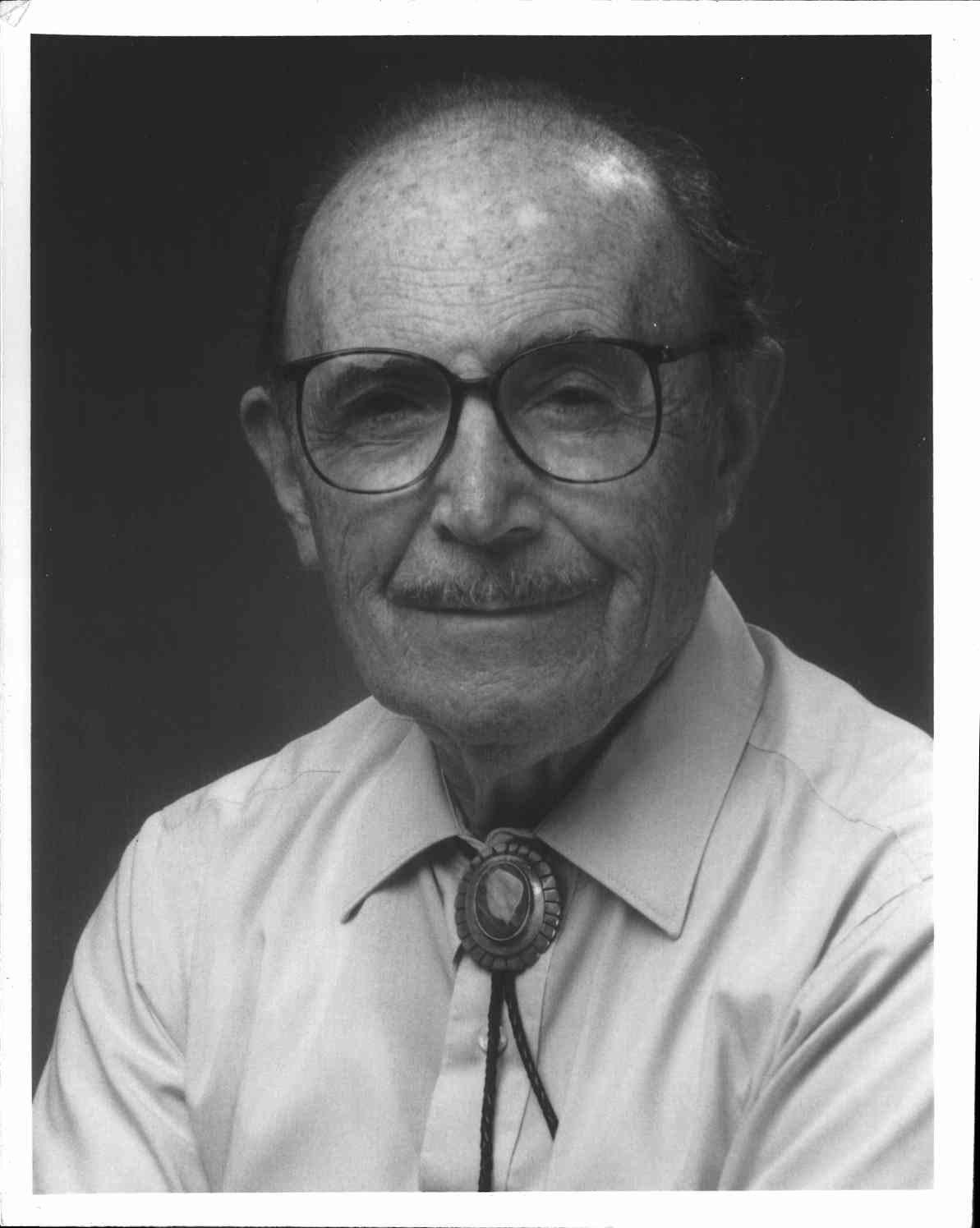
- Elias Burstein
- Born: September 30, 1917; Brooklyn, New York
- Died: June 17, 2017 (aged 99); Bryn Mawr, Pennsylvania
- Education: Brooklyn College; University of Kansas
- Known for: research in optical physics of solids
- Awards: John Price Wetherill Medal(1979); Frank Isakson Prize(1986)
- Scientific career
- Fields: Condensed-matter physics
- Workplaces: U.S. Naval Research Laboratory; University of Pennsylvania
- Doctoral students: Aron Pinczuk; Phillip J. Stiles

Elias Burstein (September 30, 1917 – June 17, 2017) was an American experimental condensed matter physicist whose active career in science spanned seven decades. He is known for his pioneering fundamental research in the optical physics of solids; for writing and editing hundreds of articles and other publications; for bringing together scientists from around the world in international meetings, conferences, and symposia; and for training and mentoring dozens of younger physicists.

== Education ==
Burstein earned a BA degree in chemistry from Brooklyn College (1938) and an MA degree in chemistry from the University of Kansas (1941). He took graduate courses in chemistry and physics at MIT (1941–43) and in physics at Catholic University (1946–48). His doctoral studies were interrupted by the war in 1945, when he went to work at the Naval Research Laboratory in Washington, DC. Although he did not earn a PhD degree, he received four honorary doctorates (see Honors).

== Positions ==
Burstein was a member of the physics section of the crystal branch at the U.S. Naval Research Laboratory (1945–58), later head of that branch (1948-1958), and thereafter head of the semiconductors branch (1958).

In 1958 he was appointed professor of physics at the University of Pennsylvania, and in 1982 he succeeded Nobel Laureate John Robert Schrieffer as Mary Amanda Wood Professor of Physics. He retired as a member of the standing faculty in 1988, but has remained active as Mary Amanda Wood Professor Emeritus.

He held visiting professorships at the University of California, Irvine (1967–68), at the Hebrew University in Israel (1974), at the University of Parma in Italy (1974); was the Fiftieth Anniversary Jubilee Visiting Professor at Chalmers University of Technology in Gothenburg, Sweden (1981); and was Miller Visiting Research Professor in the department of physics at the University of California, Berkeley (1996).

Among his numerous professional roles, he was a member of the Solid State Sciences Committee of the National Research Council of the National Academy of Sciences (1971–80) and served as its Chairman (1976–78). He was a member of the Arts and Sciences Committee of the Franklin Institute starting in 1995.

== Professional accomplishments ==
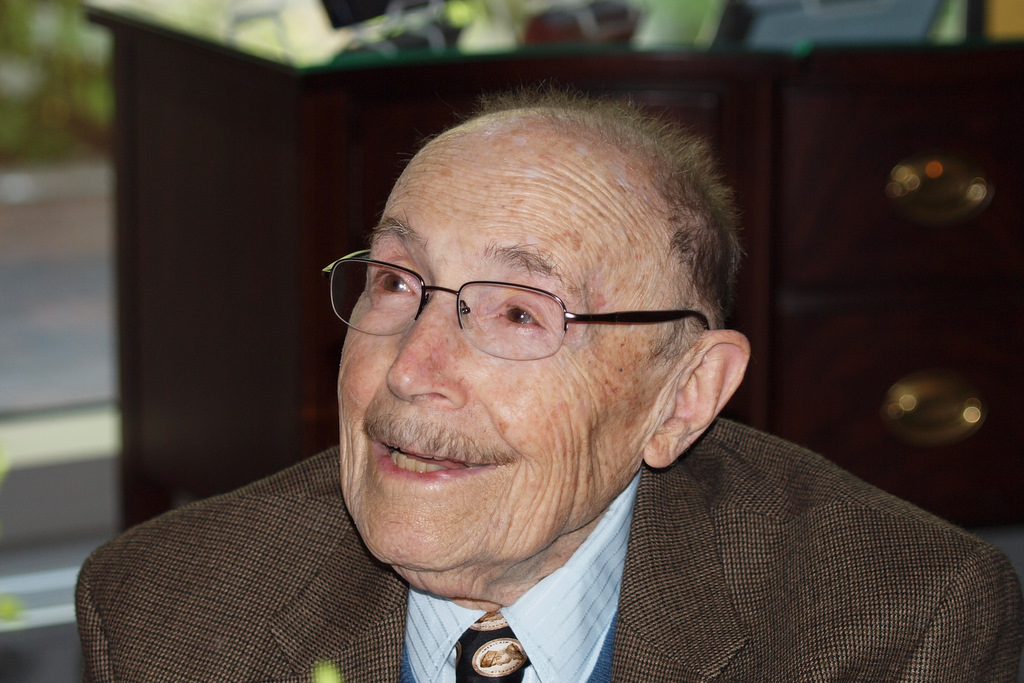
E. Burstein, 2010

During his career Burstein trained more than thirty-five PhD students in physics as well as five postdoctoral research associates. He published over 200 papers and has two patents for impurity-doped silicon and germanium infrared photo-detectors. He also initiated and organized many international conferences, bringing together physicists from all over the globe to share the results of their research and theoretical work, and to confer with each other.

He was the founding editor of Solid State Communications (Pergamon Press) and its editor-in-chief (1963–92). In that capacity he was instrumental in establishing its editorial and publication policies, including granting each editor on its International Board of Editors full authority to accept or reject contributions. He has been co-editor of Comments on Condensed Matter Physics (Gordon and Breach) (1971-1981), and is Founding Editor and Co-Editor with Marvin Cohen, Douglas Mills, and Phillip J. Stiles of the series of volumes Contemporary Concepts of Condensed Matter Science, published by Elsevier.

Burstein along with Robert Hughes of the chemistry department and Robert Madden of the metallurgy department (both at the University of Pennsylvania), were the principal originators of the proposal to establish a laboratory for fundamental research on materials at the university. This led to the founding of the Laboratory for Research on the Structure of Matter (LRSM) at the University of Pennsylvania in 1961.

== Principal areas of scientific research ==
Burstein's pioneering scientific achievements have had a major impact on the understanding of fundamental optical phenomena that are exhibited by condensed matter. His early work with diamond-structure crystals and with rock salt and zincblende type crystals at the Naval Research Laboratory (NRL) elucidated their infrared properties, explaining the mechanisms of second-order infrared absorption by long wavelength lattice vibrations in terms of electrical and mechanical anharmonicity. His fundamental studies of infrared photoconductivity due to the photoionization of impurities in silicon and germanium at liquid helium temperature provided the foundation for the development of impurity-doped silicon and germanium infrared detectors. The 1954 paper that has become his most-cited publication explained an "anomalous shift" of the interband optical absorption edge of InSb to higher energies that had been reported by researchers at Bell Labs. The shift results from the conservation of wave vector in optical interband transitions when the Pauli exclusion principle forbids transitions to carrier-occupied states in the conduction or valence band. In later work at NRL, Burstein and his collaborators used low temperature absorption spectra to study the excited states of shallow impurities in silicon and detected deviations from the existing theoretical models. In other work, they investigated interband magneto-optical transitions in semiconductors, and formulated the theory of the phenomenon in terms of interband transitions between Landau subbands. They also reported the first observation of cyclotron resonance of electrons in InSb at room temperature at frequencies in the infrared, and explained this quantum mechanically as corresponding to intraband optical transitions between discrete Landau levels within the valence or conduction bands.

At the University of Pennsylvania, Burstein and his graduate students continued ground-breaking research on semiconductors, insulators, metals, and two-dimensional electron plasmas in semiconductors, contributing to the understanding of the optical behavior of solid state materials. Burstein was one of the first to use lasers to do fundamental research on semiconductors and insulators, and he played an integral role in determining the mechanisms underlying inelastic light (Raman) scattering phenomena and the conditions for their observation. He and his students observed that an applied electric field induced normally forbidden infrared absorption by long wavelength optical lattice vibrations in diamond structure crystals. This phenomenon was attributed to the creation of an oscillating electric moment that couples to the electromagnetic radiation. Further work lead to the investigation of the role of surface space charge electric fields and associated band-bending in inducing an otherwise forbidden Raman scattering by longitudinal optical vibration modes in InSb. This phenomenon was used as a spectroscopic probe of band-bending at PbTe and SnSe surfaces and to determine the dependence of the band-bending on surface orientation.

Burstein and his collaborators also gave a theoretical formulation of Raman scattering by surface polaritons at interfaces on semiconductor surfaces which specified the conditions for observing that phenomenon and explained why backward scattering had never been observed; the cross-section for backward scattering is orders of magnitude smaller than that for forward scattering. They measured Raman scattering by the "soft" optical phonons in BaTiO_{3}, and used the measurement of the forward Raman scattering by optical lattice vibration polaritons to determine its low frequency dielectric constant in what has been called the first practical application of polaritons. They also formulated two major mechanisms for surface-enhanced Raman scattering (“SERS”) by molecules adsorbed on metal surfaces: the enhancement of the incident and scattered electromagnetic fields by surface roughness, and the occurrence of intermolecular adsorbed molecule-metal substrate charge-transfer resonance. The inelastic light scattering by single particle excitations at a GaAs surface was successfully observed using laser frequencies near the E_{0} + Δ_{0} energy gap of n-GaAs. Burstein and co-workers pointed out that the cross-section for light scattering by single particle excitations in inversion layers and quantum wells (i.e., two dimensional electron systems) of polar semiconductors is strongly enhanced for incident laser frequencies at energy gaps where the direct optical interband transitions involve carrier-occupied states in either the conduction or valence band. This insight and further work led to their formulation of the mechanisms underlying the inelastic light scattering by charge carriers in 2-dimensional plasmas, as well as the specific nature of the coupled LO phonon-intersubband excitation modes of polar semiconductors. Burstein and his graduate students carried out theoretical and experimental investigations of the nonlinear optical response of noble metal surfaces (three-wave mixing and second harmonic generation), interpreting the resonant three-wave mixing in terms of three-step electronic processes that involve intrinsic surface states and surface modified continuum states.

In the later part of his career, Burstein and collaborators discovered that fullerene molecules C_{60} (“buckyballs”) in close proximity to a smooth metal surface exhibit normally forbidden modes of luminescence –– a singlet exciton fluorescence and a triplet exciton phosphorescence. The metal-induced fluorescence was attributed to the lowering of the symmetry of the molecules. The metal-induced phosphorescence was attributed to the mixing of the singlet and triplet exciton states of the molecules by the spin-orbit interaction of the molecules with the metal atoms, and to the mixing of the singlet and triplet states by the virtual hopping of electrons between the excited molecules and the metal, both new mechanisms for turning on the phosphorescence of molecules.

== Selected publications ==
- “Tunneling Phenomena in Solids”, edited by E. Burstein and S. Lundqvist, (Plenum Press, New York 1969)
- Enrico Fermi Summer School Course LII on “Atomic Structure and Properties of Solids”, edited by E. Burstein and F. Bassani (Academic Press Inc, New York, 1972)
- Proceedings of Conference on “Polaritons”, edited by E. Burstein and F. De Martini, (Pergamon Press, New York 1974).
- Inelastic Light Scattering: Proceedings of the 1979 US-Japan Seminar held at Santa Monica California, 1979, edited by E. Burstein and H. Kawamura. (Pergamon Press, New York, 1980)
- "Confined Electrons and Photons: New Physics and Applications," The Volume of Lectures of NATO Advanced Summer School, Erice, Italy, edited by E. Burstein and C. Weisbuch (Plenum Press, London 1995).

== Honors ==
Burstein received a number of honors, including:

- Brooklyn College Chemistry Department Gold Medal (1938) for "outstanding record as an undergraduate student in chemistry."
- Annual Award of the Washington Academy of Sciences (1957) "in recognition of his distinguished study of impurity levels and effective mass in semiconductors" (awarded to persons under 40 years of age).
- Alumni Award of Honor of Brooklyn College (1960) "for major experimental achievements as a solid state physicist."
- Election to the National Academy of Sciences (1979) "in recognition of outstanding contributions in condensed matter physics and, in particular, his pioneering studies of optical properties of semiconductors."
- The John Price Wetherill Medal of the Franklin Institute (1979) "in recognition of the outstanding contributions to the science of optical properties of solids and its application to photoconductive technology"
- Guggenheim Foundation Fellowship (1980)
- The Frank Isakson Prize of the American Physical Society (1986) "for his pioneering work on the optical properties of semiconductors and insulators, particularly extrinsic photoconductivity, the anomalous band-edge optical absorption shift (Burstein shift), magneto-optical effects in semiconductors, and infrared and Raman processes"
- Von Humboldt US Senior Scientist Award (1988–90,1991–92)
- Honorary Doctor of Technology degree from Chalmers University of Technology in Gothenburg, Sweden (1981)
- Honorary Doctor of Science degrees from Brooklyn College, New York (1985), from Emory University, Atlanta GA (1994), and Ohio State University, Columbus OH (1999)
- Fellow of the American Physical Society (1965), of the Optical Society of America (1965), and of the American Association for the Advancement of Science (2002)

== Personal ==
Burstein was born September 30, 1917, in Brooklyn, New York, to Russian-born Jewish parents Samuel Burstein (1890-1950) and Sara Plotkin (1896-1985). He married Rena Ruth Benson on September 19, 1943. He is the father of three daughters (Joanna, Sandra, and Miriam), and has two grandchildren.

Burstein died on June 17, 2017, in Bryn Mawr, Pennsylvania, at the age of 99.
