= Thomas Timusk =

Estonian-born Canadian physicist (1933–2025)

Tom Timusk (June 3, 1933 – January 12, 2025) was an Estonian-born Canadian physicist and academic who was Professor Emeritus of Physics at McMaster University in Hamilton, Ontario. He was also a member of the Condensed Matter research team at McMaster.

== Background ==
Timusk was born in Narva, Estonia on June 3, 1933. An immigrant, he was displaced by the Second World War, and settled in Hamilton, Ontario, Canada. He graduated with a BA in physics from the University of Toronto. He obtained his PhD at Cornell University where his research was funded by a US Navy grant. He did his post-doctorate work in Frankfurt, Germany and at the University of Illinois, Urbana-Champaign. In 1965, he accepted a position at McMaster University where he spent his time as a professor until his retirement. Timusk died on January 12, 2025, at the age of 91.

== Research ==
Timusk started his research in spectroscopy and he was considered an experimental physicist. His original lab at McMaster was known as the Solid State Lab in the basement of the Senior Sciences Building. As of 2009 he had two labs and continued to complete active funded research. Timusk also researched superconductivity theory.

== Associations ==
Timusk was an active member of both the Canadian Association of Physicists and American Physics Society. He was also inducted in the Royal Society of Canada in 1995.

== Awards ==
- 2002 Frank Isakson Prize for Optical Effects in Solids (co-winner)
- 2000 Canadian Association of Physicists' Brockhouse Medal

== Papers ==
- T. Timusk & B. Statt (1999). "The pseudogap in high-temperature superconductors: an experimental survey". Reports on Progress in Physics. 62 (1): 61–122. arXiv:cond-mat/9905219. Bibcode:1999RPPh...62...61T. doi:10.1088/0034-4885/62/1/002. S2CID 250893405.
- T. Timusk (1999). "Infrared properties of exotic superconductors". Physica C. 317–318 (1–2): 18–29. arXiv:cond-mat/9903254. Bibcode:1999PhyC..317...18T. doi:10.1016/S0921-4534(99)00042-8. S2CID 119100405.
- T. Timusk & D.B. Tanner. "Infrared Properties of High temperature Superconductors". In D.M. Ginsberg (ed.). Physical Properties of High Temperature Superconductors. World Scientific.

== Sources ==
- J. Hwang; T. Timusk; J.P. Carbotte (2007). "Scanning-tunnelling spectra of cuprates". Nature. 446 (7132): E3-4. Bibcode:2007Natur.446....3H. doi:10.1038/nature05709. PMID 17344807. S2CID 4431112.
- "Closing in on a theory of superconductivity". Physics World. 2004. Archived from the original on 2009-01-07.
