= Vienna Ab initio Simulation Package =

Software for condensed matter physics

VASP
- Stable release: 6.5.1 / 11 March 2025; 6 months ago
- Available in: English
- Type: Density functional theory, Many-body perturbation theory, Time-dependent density functional theory
- License: Proprietary
- Website: www.vasp.at

The Vienna Ab initio Simulation Package, better known as VASP, is a package written primarily in Fortran for performing ab initio quantum mechanical calculations using either Vanderbilt pseudopotentials, or the projector augmented wave method, and a plane wave basis set. The basic methodology is density functional theory (DFT), but the code also allows use of post-DFT corrections such as hybrid functionals mixing DFT and Hartree–Fock exchange (e.g. HSE, PBE0 or B3LYP), many-body perturbation theory (the GW method) and dynamical electronic correlations within the random phase approximation (RPA) and MP2.

Originally, VASP was based on code written by Mike Payne (then at MIT), which was also the basis of CASTEP. It was then brought to the University of Vienna, Austria, in July 1989 by Jürgen Hafner. The main program was written by Jürgen Furthmüller, who joined the group at the Institut für Materialphysik in January 1993, and Georg Kresse. An early version of VASP was called VAMP. VASP is currently being developed by Georg Kresse; recent additions include the extension of methods frequently used in molecular quantum chemistry to periodic systems. VASP is currently used by more than 1400 research groups in academia and industry worldwide on the basis of software licence agreements with the University of Vienna. Because VASP can be used for a wide range of applications such as phonon calculations and structure calculations, it is widely employed in the fields of condensed matter physics, materials science, and quantum chemistry.

Recent version history: VASP.6.4.1 on 7 April 2023, VASP.6.4.2 on 20 July 2023, VASP.6.4.3 on 19 March 2024 and VASP.6.5.0 on 17 December 2024.

== See also ==
- Quantum chemistry computer programs
