= Pwpaw =

PWPAW A Projector Augmented Wave (PAW) code for electronic structure calculation. It is a free software package, distributed under the copyleft GNU General Public License. It is a plane wave implementation of the projector augmented wave (PAW) method developed by Peter E. Blöchl for electronic structure calculations within the framework of density functional theory. In addition to the self-consistent calculation of the electronic structure of a periodic solid, the program has a number of other capabilities, including structural geometry optimization and molecular dynamics simulations within the Born–Oppenheimer approximation.

== See also ==
- Atompaw Software package for electron configuration calculations
- EXCITING
- Bloch's theorem
