= GW approximation =

Approximation in many-body systems

The GW approximation is a method used to calculate the self-energy of a many-body system of electrons. The approximation is that the expansion of the self-energy Σ in terms of the single particle Green's function G and the screened Coulomb interaction W

$$\Sigma = iGW - GWGWG + \cdots$$

can be truncated after the first term:

$$\Sigma \approx iG W$$

In other words, the self-energy is expanded in a formal Taylor series in powers of the screened interaction W and the lowest order term is kept in the expansion in GW approximation.

== Theory ==
The above formulae are schematic in nature and show the overall idea of the approximation. More precisely, if we label an electron coordinate with its position, spin, and time and bundle all three into a composite index (the numbers 1, 2, etc.), we have

$$\Sigma(1,2) = iG(1,2)W(1^+,2) - \int d3 \int d4 \, G(1,3)G(3,4)G(4,2)W(1,4)W(3,2) + ...$$

where the "+" superscript means the time index is shifted forward by an infinitesimal amount. The GW approximation is then

$$\Sigma(1,2) \approx iG(1,2)W(1^+,2)$$

To put this in context, if one replaces W by the bare Coulomb interaction (i.e. the usual 1/r interaction), one generates the standard perturbative series for the self-energy found in most many-body textbooks. The GW approximation with W replaced by the bare Coulomb yields nothing other than the Hartree–Fock exchange potential (self-energy). Therefore, loosely speaking, the GW approximation represents a type of dynamically screened Hartree–Fock self-energy.

In a solid state system, the series for the self-energy in terms of W should converge much faster than the traditional series in the bare Coulomb interaction. This is because the screening of the medium reduces the effective strength of the Coulomb interaction: for example, if one places an electron at some position in a material and asks what the potential is at some other position in the material, the value is smaller than given by the bare Coulomb interaction (inverse distance between the points) because the other electrons in the medium polarize (move or distort their electronic states) so as to screen the electric field. Therefore, W is a smaller quantity than the bare Coulomb interaction so that a series in W should have higher hopes of converging quickly.

To see the more rapid convergence, we can consider the simplest example involving the homogeneous or uniform electron gas which is characterized by an electron density or equivalently the average electron-electron separation or Wigner–Seitz radius $r_s$. (We only present a scaling argument and will not compute numerical prefactors that are order unity.) Here are the key steps:

- The kinetic energy of an electron scales as $1/r_s^2$
- The average electron-electron repulsion from the bare (unscreened) Coulomb interaction scales as $1/r_s$ (simply the inverse of the typical separation)
- The electron gas dielectric function in the simplest Thomas–Fermi screening model for a wave vector $q$ is

$$\epsilon(q) = 1 + \lambda^2/q^2$$

where $\lambda$ is the screening wave number that scales as $r_s^{-1/2}$

- Typical wave vectors $q$ scale as $1/r_s$ (again typical inverse separation)
- Hence a typical screening value is $\epsilon \sim 1 + r_s$
- The screened Coulomb interaction is $W(q) = V(q)/\epsilon(q)$

Thus for the bare Coulomb interaction, the ratio of Coulomb to kinetic energy is of order $r_s$ which is of order 2-5 for a typical metal and not small at all: in other words, the bare Coulomb interaction is rather strong and makes for a poor perturbative expansion. On the other hand, the ratio of a typical $W$ to the kinetic energy is greatly reduced by the screening and is of order $r_s/(1+r_s)$ which is well behaved and smaller than unity even for large $r_s$: the screened interaction is much weaker and is more likely to give a rapidly converging perturbative series.

== History ==
The first GW calculation with the Hartree–Fock method was performed in 1958 by John Quinn and Richard Allan Ferrell, but with many approximations and using a limited approach. Donald F. Dubois then used this method to obtain results for a very small Wigner–Seitz radius or very large electron densities in 1959. The first full calculation using GW was done by Lars Hedin in 1965; Hedin's equations for the GW method are named after him.

With the advancement of computational resources, it became possible to study real materials using GW in the 1980s, with the works of Mark S. Hybertsen and Steven Gwon Sheng Louie.

== Software ==
- ABINIT - plane-wave pseudopotential method
- ADF - Slater basis set method
- BerkeleyGW - plane-wave pseudopotential method
- CP2K - Gaussian-based low-scaling all-electron and pseudopotential method
- ComDMFT - full-potential linearized augmented plane-wave (FP-LAPW) method with optionally additional DMFT functionality support, whereas the GW part was originally developed as LqsgwFlapw
- ELK - full-potential (linearized) augmented plane-wave (FP-LAPW) method
- FHI-aims - numeric atom-centered orbitals method
- Fiesta - Gaussian all-electron method
- GAP - an all-electron GW code based on augmented plane-waves, currently interfaced with WIEN2k
- GPAW
- GREEN - fully self-consistent GW in Gaussian basis for molecules and solids with optionally SEET support
- Molgw - small gaussian basis code
- momentGW - gaussian basis code with moment decomposition of the Green function
- NanoGW - real-space wave functions and Lanczos iterative methods
- PySCF
- QuantumATK - LCAO and PW methods.
- Quantum ESPRESSO - Wannier-function pseudopotential method
- Questaal - Full Potential (FP-LMTO) method
- SaX - plane-wave pseudopotential method
- Spex - full-potential (linearized) augmented plane-wave (FP-LAPW) method
- TURBOMOLE - Gaussian all-electron method
- VASP - projector-augmented-wave (PAW) method
- West - large scale GW
- YAMBO code - plane-wave pseudopotential method

== Sources ==
- The key publications concerning the application of the GW approximation
- Picture of Lars Hedin, inventor of GW
- GW100 - Benchmarking the GW approach for molecules.
