= Runge–Gross theorem =

In quantum mechanics, specifically time-dependent density functional theory, the Runge–Gross theorem (RG theorem) shows that for a many-body system evolving from a given initial wavefunction, there exists a one-to-one mapping between the potential (or potentials) in which the system evolves and the density (or densities) of the system. The potentials under which the theorem holds are defined up to an additive purely time-dependent function: such functions only change the phase of the wavefunction and leave the density invariant. Most often the RG theorem is applied to molecular systems where the electronic density, ρ(r,t) changes in response to an external scalar potential, v(r,t), such as a time-varying electric field.

The Runge–Gross theorem provides the formal foundation of time-dependent density functional theory. It shows that the density can be used as the fundamental variable in describing quantum many-body systems in place of the wavefunction, and that all properties of the system are functionals of the density.

The theorem was published by Erich Runge and Eberhard K. U. Gross in 1984. As of September 2021, the original paper has been cited over 5,700 times.

== Overview ==
The Runge–Gross theorem was originally derived for electrons moving in a scalar external field. Given such a field denoted by v and the number of electron, N, which together determine a Hamiltonian H_{v}, and an initial condition on the wavefunction Ψ(t = t_{0}) = Ψ_{0}, the evolution of the wavefunction is determined by the Schrödinger equation (written in atomic units)

$$\hat{H}_v(t)|\Psi(t)\rangle=i\frac{\partial}{\partial t}|\Psi(t)\rangle.$$

At any given time, the N-electron wavefunction, which depends upon 3N spatial and N spin coordinates, determines the electronic density through integration as

$$\rho(\mathbf r,t)=N\sum_{s_1} \cdots \sum_{s_N} \int \ \mathrm d\mathbf r_2 \ \cdots \int\ \mathrm d\mathbf r_N  \ |\Psi(\mathbf r,s_1,\mathbf r_2,s_2,...,\mathbf r_N,s_N,t)|^2.$$

Two external potentials differing only by an additive time-dependent, spatially independent, function, c(t), give rise to wavefunctions differing only by a phase factor exp(-i α(t)), with dα(t)/dt = c(t), and therefore the same electronic density. These constructions provide a mapping from an external potential to the electronic density:

$$v(\mathbf r,t)+c(t)\rightarrow e^{-ic(t)}|\Psi(t)\rangle\rightarrow\rho(\mathbf r,t).$$

The Runge–Gross theorem shows that this mapping is invertible, modulo c(t). Equivalently, that the density is a functional of the external potential and of the initial wavefunction on the space of potentials differing by more than the addition of c(t):

$$\rho(\mathbf r,t)=\rho[v,\Psi_0](\mathbf{r},t)\leftrightarrow v(\mathbf r,t)=v[\rho,\Psi_0](\mathbf r,t)$$

== Proof ==
Given two scalar potentials denoted as v(r,t) and v'(r,t), which differ by more than an additive purely time-dependent term, the proof follows by showing that the density corresponding to each of the two scalar potentials, obtained by solving the Schrödinger equation, differ.

The proof relies heavily on the assumption that the external potential can be expanded in a Taylor series about the initial time. This is remedied by the van Leeuwen theorem from 1999. The proof also assumes that the density vanishes at infinity, making it valid only for finite systems.

The Runge–Gross proof first shows that there is a one-to-one mapping between external potentials and current densities by invoking the Heisenberg equation of motion for the current density so as to relate time-derivatives of the current density to spatial derivatives of the external potential. Given this result, the continuity equation is used in a second step to relate time-derivatives of the electronic density to time-derivatives of the external potential.

The assumption that the two potentials differ by more than an additive spatially independent term, and are expandable in a Taylor series, means that there exists an integer k ≥ 0, such that

$$u_{k}(\mathbf{r})\equiv\left.\frac{\partial^k}{\partial t^k}\big(v(\mathbf{r},t)-v'(\mathbf{r},t)\big)\right|_{t=t_0}$$

is not constant in space. This condition is used throughout the argument.

=== Step 1 ===
From the Heisenberg equation of motion, the time evolution of the current density, j(r,t), under the external potential v(r,t) which determines the Hamiltonian H_{v}, is

$$i\frac{\partial\mathbf j(\mathbf r,t)}{\partial t}=\langle\Psi(t)|[\hat{\mathbf{j}}(\mathbf r),\hat{H}_v(t)]|\Psi(t)\rangle.$$

Introducing two potentials v and v', differing by more than an additive spatially constant term, and their corresponding current densities j and j', the Heisenberg equation implies

$$\begin{align}
i\left.\frac{\partial}{\partial t}\big(\mathbf j(\mathbf r,t)-\mathbf j'(\mathbf r,t) \big)\right|_{t=t_0} &= \langle\Psi(t_0)|[\hat{\mathbf{j}}(\mathbf r),\hat{H}_{v}(t_0)-\hat{H}_{v'}(t_0)]|\Psi(t_0)\rangle,\\
&=\langle\Psi(t_0)|[\hat{\mathbf{j}}(\mathbf r),\hat{V}(t_0)-\hat{V}'(t_0)]|\Psi(t_0)\rangle,\\
&= i\rho(\mathbf r,t_0)\nabla\big(v(\mathbf{r},t_0)-v'(\mathbf{r},t_0)\big).
\end{align}$$

The final line shows that if the two scalar potentials differ at the initial time by more than a spatially independent function, then the current densities that the potentials generate will differ infinitesimally after t_{0}. If the two potentials do not differ at t_{0}, but u_{k}(r) ≠ 0 for some value of k, then repeated application of the Heisenberg equation shows that

$$i^{k+1}\left.\frac{\partial^{k+1}}{\partial t^{k+1}}\big(\mathbf j(\mathbf r,t)-\mathbf j'(\mathbf r,t)\big)\right|_{t=t_0}=i\rho(\mathbf r,t)\nabla i^k\left.\frac{\partial^{k}}{\partial t^{k}}\big(v(\mathbf{r},t)-v'(\mathbf{r},t) \big)\right|_{t=t_0},$$

ensuring the current densities will differ from zero infinitesimally after t_{0}.

=== Step 2 ===
The electronic density and current density are related by a continuity equation of the form

$$\frac{\partial\rho(\mathbf r,t)}{\partial t}+\nabla\cdot\mathbf j(\mathbf r,t)=0.$$

Repeated application of the continuity equation to the difference of the densities ρ and ρ', and current densities j and j', yields

$$\begin{align}
\left.\frac{\partial^{k+2}}{\partial t^{k+2}}(\rho(\mathbf r,t)-\rho'(\mathbf r,t))\right|_{t=t_0}&=-\nabla\cdot\left.\frac{\partial^{k+1}}{\partial t^{k+1}}\big(\mathbf j(\mathbf r,t)-\mathbf j'(\mathbf r,t)\big)\right|_{t=t_0},\\
&=-\nabla\cdot[\rho(\mathbf r,t_0)\nabla\left.\frac{\partial^k}{\partial t^k}\big(v(\mathbf{r},t_0)-v'(\mathbf{r},t_0)\big)\right|_{t=t_0}],\\
&=-\nabla\cdot[\rho(\mathbf r,t_0)\nabla u_k(\mathbf r)].
\end{align}$$

The two densities will then differ if the right-hand side (RHS) is non-zero for some value of k. The non-vanishing of the RHS follows by a reductio ad absurdum argument. Assuming, contrary to our desired outcome, that

$$\nabla\cdot(\rho(\mathbf r,t_0)\nabla u_k(\mathbf r)) = 0,$$

integrate over all space and apply Green's theorem.

$$\begin{align}
0&=\int\mathrm d\mathbf r\ u_k(\mathbf r)\nabla\cdot(\rho(\mathbf r,t_0)\nabla u_k(\mathbf r)),\\
&=-\int\mathrm d\mathbf r\ \rho(\mathbf r,t_0)(\nabla u_k(\mathbf r))^2+\frac{1}{2}\int \mathrm d\mathbf S\cdot\rho(\mathbf r,t_0)(\nabla u_k^2(\mathbf r)).
\end{align}$$

The second term is a surface integral over an infinite sphere. Assuming that the density is zero at infinity (in finite systems, the density decays to zero exponentially) and that ∇u_{k}^{2}(r) increases slower than the density decays, the surface integral vanishes and, because of the non-negativity of the density,

$$\rho(\mathbf r,t_0)(\nabla u_k(\mathbf r))^2=0,$$

implying that u_{k} is a constant, contradicting the original assumption and completing the proof.

== Extensions ==
The Runge–Gross proof is valid for pure electronic states in the presence of a scalar field. The first extension of the RG theorem was to time-dependent ensembles, which employed the Liouville equation to relate the Hamiltonian and density matrix. A proof of the RG theorem for multicomponent systems—where more than one type of particle is treated within the full quantum theory—was introduced in 1986. Incorporation of magnetic effects requires the introduction of a vector potential (A(r)) which together with the scalar potential uniquely determine the current density. Time-dependent density functional theories of superconductivity were introduced in 1994 and 1995. Here, scalar, vector, and pairing (D(t)) potentials map between current and anomalous (Δ_{IP}(r,t)) densities.
