= Edwin E. Salpeter =

Austrian–Australian–American astrophysicist (1924–2008)

Edwin Salpeter
- Born: Edwin Ernest Salpeter; 3 December 1924; Vienna, Austria
- Died: 26 November 2008 (aged 83); Ithaca, New York, U.S.
- Education: University of Sydney (BSc); University of Birmingham (PhD)
- Known for: Salpeter initial mass function, Bethe–Salpeter equation
- Spouses: Miriam Mark (1950–2000); Antonia Shouse (–2008)
- Children: 2
- Scientific career
- Fields: Astrophysics
- Workplaces: Cornell University
- Thesis: On the electromagnetic self-energy of the electron (1948)
- Doctoral advisor: Rudolf Peierls
- Doctoral students: Hubert Reeves

Edwin Ernest Salpeter (3 December 1924 – 26 November 2008) was an Austrian–Australian–American astrophysicist.

== Life ==
Born in Vienna to a Jewish family, Salpeter emigrated from Austria to Australia while in his teens to escape the Nazis. He attended Sydney Boys High School (1939–40) and Sydney University, where he obtained his bachelor's degree in 1944 and his master's degree in 1945. In the same year he was awarded an overseas scholarship and attended the University of Birmingham, England, where he earned his doctorate in 1948 under the supervision of Sir Rudolf Peierls. He spent the remainder of his career at Cornell University, where he was the James Gilbert White Distinguished Professor of the Physical Sciences. Salpeter died of leukemia at his home in Ithaca, New York on 26 November 2008.

== Scientific contributions ==
Salpeter has made a wide range of important contributions to physics and astronomy. In 1951 Salpeter suggested that stars could burn helium-4 into carbon-12 with the triple-alpha process not directly, but through an intermediate metastable state of beryllium-8, which helped to explain the carbon production in stars. He later derived the initial mass function for the formation rates of stars of different mass in the Galaxy.

Salpeter wrote with Hans Bethe two articles in 1951 which introduced the equation bearing their names, the Bethe–Salpeter equation which describes the interactions between a pair of fundamental particles under a quantum field theory.

In 1955 he found the Salpeter function or the initial mass function (IMF). It shows that the number of stars in each mass range decreases rapidly with increasing mass.

In 1964 Salpeter and independently Yakov B. Zel'dovich were the first to suggest that accretion discs around massive black holes are responsible for the huge amounts of energy radiated by quasars (which are the brightest active galactic nuclei). This is currently the most accepted explanation for the physical origin of active galactic nuclei and the associated extragalactic relativistic jets.

In early 1970s, Salpeter discovered that molecular hydrogen and many other molecular species are formed in the interstellar medium not as much in the gas phase but primarily on the surfaces of dust particles.

== Family ==
In 1950 he married Miriam (Mika) Mark (1929–2000), a neurobiologist born in Riga, Latvia; she was chairwoman of the department of neurobiology and behavior at Cornell from 1982 to 1988. The Society for Neuroscience created the Mika Salpeter award in her memory; it "recognizes an individual with outstanding career achievements in neuroscience who has also significantly promoted the professional advancement of women in neuroscience." The Salpeters had two daughters, Judy Salpeter and Dr. Shelley Salpeter. After Miriam's death, Edwin married Antonia Shouse.

== Honors ==
- Carnegie Institution for Science Award for Research in Astrophysics (1959)
- Member of the American Academy of Arts and Sciences (1967)
- Member of the United States National Academy of Sciences (1967)
- Gold Medal of the Royal Astronomical Society (1973)
- Henry Norris Russell Lectureship (1974)
- J. Robert Oppenheimer Memorial Prize (1974)
- Member of the American Philosophical Society (1977)
- Karl Schwarzschild Medal (1985)
- Bruce Medal (1987)
- Fellow of the Australian Academy of Science (1988))
- Dirac Medal of the University of South Wales (1996)
- Crafoord Prize (with Fred Hoyle) (1997)
- Hans Bethe Prize (1999)
