= David B. Tanner =

American physics professor (born 1945)

David Tanner
- Born: David Burnham Tanner; March 12, 1945 (age 81); Norfolk, Virginia
- Education: University of Virginia (B.A.); Cornell University (M.S. and Ph.D.)
- Awards: Frank Isakson Prize (2016); Special Breakthrough Prize In Fundamental Physics (2016)
- Scientific career
- Fields: Physics, Chemistry
- Workplaces: University of Pennsylvania; Ohio State University; University of Florida
- Thesis: Some size effects in metals in the far infrared (1972)
- Doctoral advisor: Albert John Sievers

David Burnham Tanner is a Distinguished Professor of Physics and an affiliate professor in the Department of Chemistry at the University of Florida.

He studied at the University of Virginia where he received his B. A. degree. He has a PhD in Physics from Cornell University.

He was elected a Fellow of the American Physical Society in 1989 "for studies of the basic infrared properties of new materials". and awarded their Frank Isakson Prize for Optical Effects in Solids in 2016.

He published the textbook Optical Effects in Solids in 2019.
