= Miriam Salpeter =

American neuroscientist

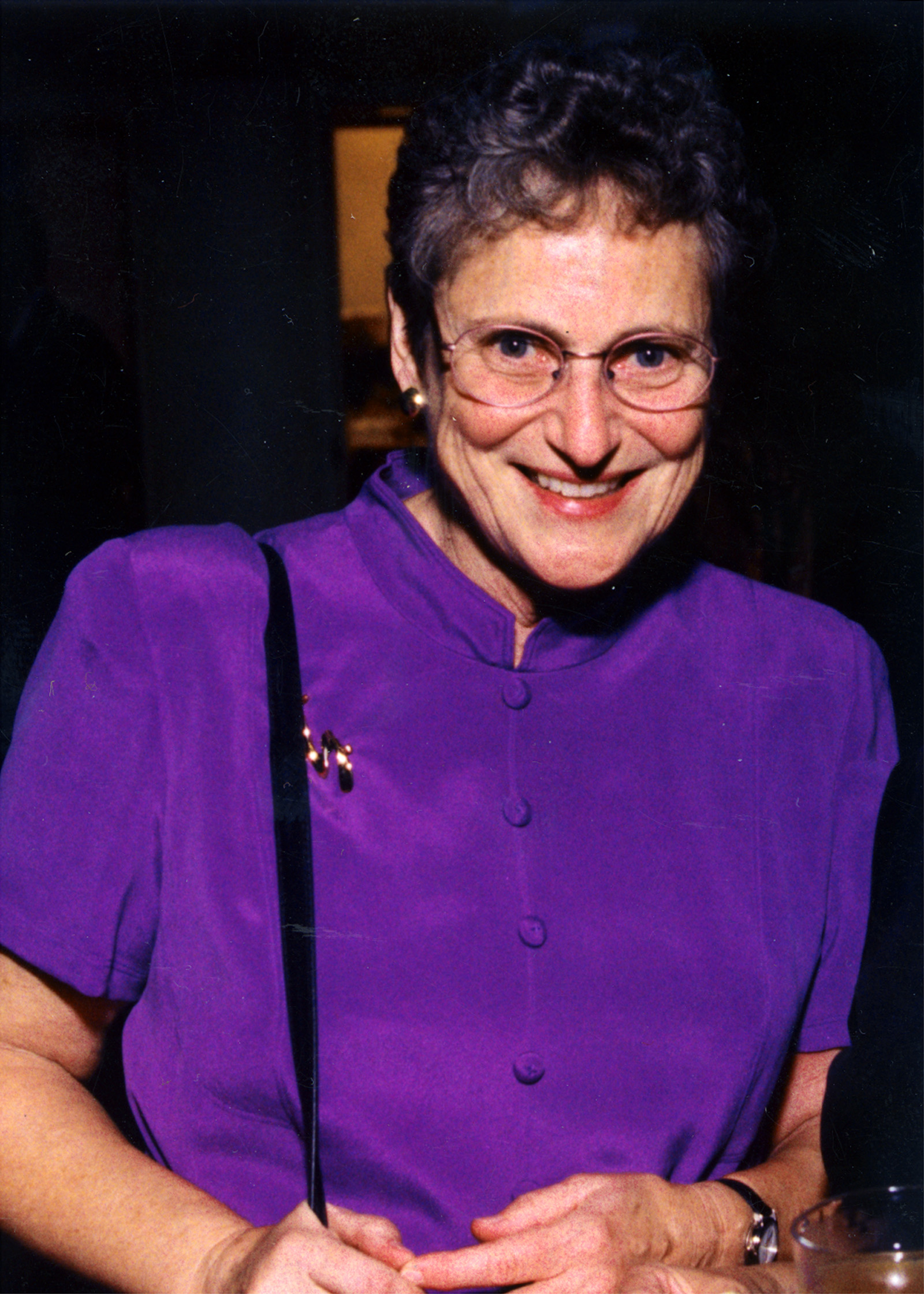
- Born: Miriam Mark; April 8, 1929; Riga, Latvia
- Died: October 24, 2000 (aged 71)
- Education: Cornell University; Hunter College
- Spouse: Edwin Ernest Salpeter
- Scientific career
- Workplaces: Cornell University

Miriam Salpeter (née Mark; April 8, 1929 – October 24, 2000) was a Latvian-born American academic. As professor of neurobiology at Cornell University, she developed quantitative electron microscopic autoradiography as a means to investigate the neuromuscular junction. The Society for Neuroscience created the Mika Salpeter Lifetime Achievement Award in her honour.

== Early life and education ==
Salpeter was born in Riga. Her father was a Yiddish scholar and Salpeter was fluent in Yiddish. During the rise of Nazi Germany Salpeter emigrated from Latvia to Canada, before moving to the United States in 1945. Salpeter attended high school in New York City. She was an undergraduate student at Hunter College, where she was a member of Phi Beta Kappa and graduated summa cum laude. Salpeter moved to Cornell University for her doctoral studies, where she earned a PhD under the supervision of Howard Liddell. She spent a year at the Australian National University before returning to Cornell University as a postdoctoral fellow with Marcus Singer. Singer's laboratory was based in the Zoology department, where she studied cells using an electron microscope. Salpeter was appointed a research associate in the Singer lab in 1961 and soon after promoted to Senior Research Associate.

== Research and career ==
Neurobiology was an emerging field at the start of Salpeter's research career, and she decided to concentrate her efforts on the neuromuscular junction. The neuromuscular junction is a synapse that controls all voluntary movement, the formation of which was extensively investigated by Salpeter throughout her research career. In particular, Salpeter looked at the role of acetylcholine receptors. Salpeter struggled to secure a faculty position at Cornell University – Singer, her biggest advocate in the department, moved to Case Western Reserve University, and the academic community were not welcoming to women. Salpeter did not let this atmosphere faze her, and continued her research as a non-faculty member. In 1967 Salpeter was recruited to the Cornell University Section of Neurobiology and Behavior. Here she worked in the laboratory of Benjamin Siegel and was supported by the National Institutes of Health. She spent a year in the laboratory of Vincent Wigglesworth at the University of Cambridge.

In 1973 Salpeter was promoted to Professor. She developed quantitative electron microscopic autoradiography, and demonstrated it as a sensitive means to study the neuromuscular junction. Salpeter collaborated with her husband, astronomer and physicist Edwin Ernest Salpeter, on the interactions between nerves and muscle fibres.

== Awards and honours ==
The Society for Neuroscience created the Mika Salpeter Lifetime Achievement Award in her honour.

Her awards and honours include:

- Society for Neuroscience Patricia Goldman-Rakic Hall of Honor
- Fellow of the American Association for the Advancement of Science
- Hall of Fame of the City University of New York
- Marcus Singer Award

== Selected publications ==
- Salpeter, Miriam M. (1969). "Resolution in electron microscope radioautography". Journal of Cell Biology. 41 (1): 1–20. doi:10.1083/jcb.41.1.1. PMC 2107734. PMID 5775785.
- Salpeter, Miriam M. (1976). "Quantitation of junctional and extrajunctional acetylcholine receptors by electron microscope autoradiography after (125)I-α-bungarotoxin binding at mouse neuromuscular junctions". Journal of Cell Biology. 69 (1): 144–158. doi:10.1083/jcb.69.1.144. PMC 2110977. PMID 1254640. S2CID 15099925.
- Salpeter, Miriam M. (1964). "Autoradiography with the electron microscope: a procedure for improving resolution, sensitivity, and contrast". Journal of Cell Biology. 22: 469–477. doi:10.1083/jcb.22.2.469. PMC 2106457. PMID 14203391.

== Personal life ==
Salpeter married Edwin Ernest Salpeter in 1950. Together they had two daughters, Judy and Shelley. At the age of 71 she was diagnosed with thyroid cancer. She continued to visit her laboratory everyday until the day that she died.
