= Manuel Cardona =

Spanish physicist (1934–2014)

Manuel Cardona Castro
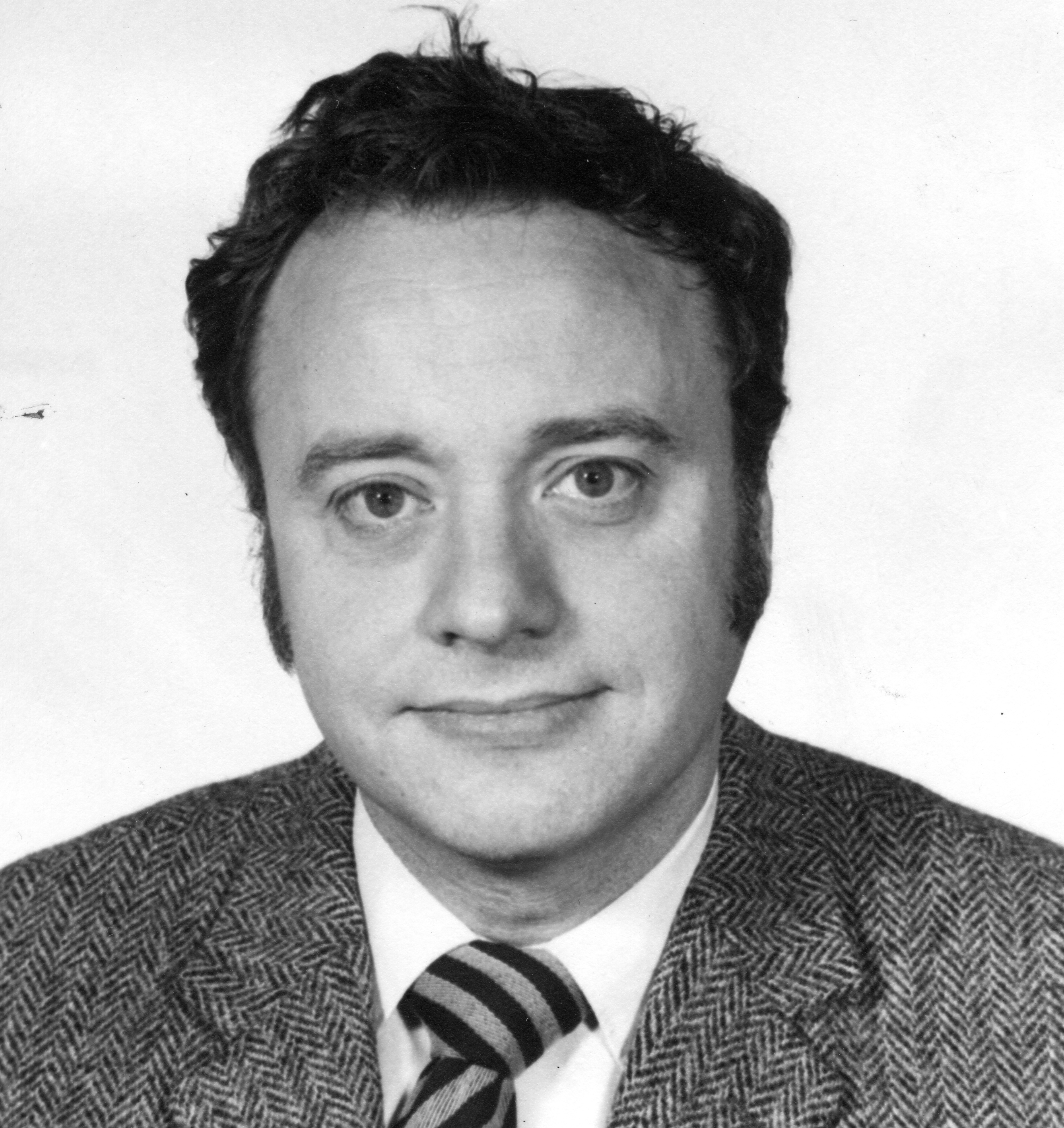
- Born: 7 September 1934; Barcelona, Spain
- Died: 2 July 2014 (aged 79); Stuttgart, Germany
- Education: Harvard University
- Known for: Fundamentals of semiconductors
- Awards: Franz Isakson Prize (1984); Nevill Mott Medal and Prize (2001)
- Scientific career
- Fields: Solid state physics
- Workplaces: Brown University; Buenos Aires University; Max Planck Institute for Solid State Research

Manuel Cardona Castro (7 September 1934 – 2 July 2014) was a Spanish condensed matter physicist. According to the ISI Citations web database, Cardona was one of the eight most cited physicists since 1970. He specialized in solid state physics. Cardona's main interests were in the fields of: Raman scattering (and other optical spectroscopies) as applied to semiconductor microstructures, materials with tailor-made isotopic compositions, and high T_{c} superconductors, particularly investigations of electronic and vibronic excitations in the normal and superconducting state.

== Academic career ==
Cardona was born in Barcelona, Spain in 1934. After obtaining a Masters in physics in 1955 from University of Barcelona Cardona was awarded a fellowship to work as a graduate student at Harvard University starting in 1956. At Harvard he began investigations of the dielectric properties of semiconductors, in particular germanium and silicon. With this work as a thesis he received a PhD in Applied Physics at Harvard. From 1959 till 1961 he continued similar work on III-V semiconductors at the RCA Laboratories in Zurich, Switzerland. In 1961 he moved to the RCA Labs in Princeton, NJ, where he continued work on the optical properties of semiconductors and started investigations of the microwave properties of superconductors. In 1964 he became a member of the Physics Faculty of Brown University (Providence, RI). In June–September 1965 he taught at the University of Buenos Aires under the auspices of the Ford Foundation. In 1971 he moved to Stuttgart, Germany as a founding director of the then-recently created Max Planck Institute for Solid State Research. Concomitantly he became scientific Member of the Max Planck Society, where he became emeritus in 2000.

From 1992 to 2004, Cardona served as chief editor of Solid State Communications.

== Distinctions and honors ==
Besides receiving over at least 61 awards during his career, Cardona held eleven honorary doctorates. Some notable honors include:

- 1964 American Physical Society, Fellow
- 1982 Narcís Monturiol Medal, Government of Catalonia
- 1984 Frank Isakson Prize, American Physical Society
- 1984 Fellow, Japanese Society for the Promotion of Science
- 1984 Corresponding Member, Royal Academy of Sciences of Barcelona
- 1987 Member, National Academy of Sciences of the USA
- 1987 Grand Cross of Alfonso X el Sabio, Spain
- 1988 Prince of Asturias Award for Technical and Scientific Research, named after the Crown Prince of Spain
- 1991 Member, Academia Europaea
- 1994 Max Planck Research Prize, shared with E. E. Haller, Berkeley
- 1995 Corresponding Member, Spanish Royal Academy of Sciences
- 1997 John Wheatley Award, American Physical Society
- 1999 Ernst Mach Medal, Prague
- 2001 Nevill Mott Medal and Prize
- 2003 Matteucci Medal by the Accademia nazionale delle scienze, Italy
- 2009 Fellow, Royal Society of Canada
- 2011 Vernadsky Gold Medal of the National Academy of Sciences of Ukraine
- 2012 Paul Klemens Award, Phonons Conference, Ann Arbor, MI.
- 2012 Luis Federico Leloir Prize, Argentina

== Publications ==
Cardona has authored over 1,300 scientific publications in international journals, ten monographs on solid state physics and co-authored a textbook on semiconductors. Since 1972, Cardona has served on the Board of Editors of at least seven journals, including being the Editor-in-Chief of Solid State Communications from 1992 to 2005.

Some of his works include:

- Manuel Cardona: Modulation Spectroscopy, Academic Press 1969. Lib of Congress 55-12299
- Manuel Cardona, Gernot Günterodt and Roberto Merlin: Light Scattering in Solids I-IX (nine volumes) Springer Verlag; ISBN 3-540-11513-7
- Pere Bonnin: Manuel Cardona i Castro, Fundació Catalana per a la Recerca, Barcelona 1998 ISBN 84-89570-18-3
- Peter Y. Yu and Manuel Cardona, Fundamentals of semiconductors, 4 editions 1996-2000,ISBN 978-3-642-00709-5

== Personal life ==
Cardona died in Stuttgart on 2 July 2014, where he lived since 1971 with his wife Inge Cardona (née Hecht). He held American, German and Spanish citizenship and had 3 children and 7 grandchildren.
