= Solid State Communications =

- Discipline: Condensed matter physics
- Language: English
- Edited by: François Peeters

Publication details
- History: 1963–present
- Publisher: Elsevier
- Frequency: Bimonthly
- Open access: Hybrid
- Impact factor: 2.8 (2025)

Standard abbreviations
- ISO 4: Solid State Commun.

Indexing
- CODEN: SSCOA4
- ISSN: 0038-1098
- LCCN: 64007448

Links
- Journal homepage; Online access

Solid State Communications is a peer-reviewed scientific journal of solid-state physics. The journal specializes in short papers on significant developments in the condensed matter science. The journal was established 1963, when the Journal of Physics and Chemistry of Solids split its letters section to create this journal. Elias Burstein served as founding chief editor until 1992, and was succeeded by Manuel Cardona until 2004, when Aron Pinczuk assumed the role. Pinczuk stepped down in 2020.

The journal is published bimonthly by Elsevier; its editor-in-chief is François Peeters.

== Abstracting and indexing ==
The journal is abstracted and indexed in the following databases:

- Cambridge Scientific Abstracts
- Chemical Abstracts
- Current Contents/Physics, Chemical, & Earth Sciences
- Current Contents/SciSearch Database
- Current Contents/Social & Behavioral Sciences
- MSCI
- Engineering Index
- INSPEC
- PASCAL/CNRS
- Research Alert
- SSSA/CISA/ECA/ISMEC
- Scopus
