= Initial mass function =

Empirical function in astronomy

In astronomy, the initial mass function (IMF) is an empirical function that describes the initial distribution of masses for a population of stars during star formation. IMF not only describes the formation and evolution of individual stars, it also serves as an important link that describes the formation and evolution of galaxies.

The IMF is often given as a probability density function (PDF) that describes the probability for a star to have a certain mass during its formation. It differs from the present-day mass function (PDMF), which describes the current distribution of masses of stars, such as red giants, white dwarfs, neutron stars, and black holes, after some time of evolution away from the main sequence stars and after a certain amount of mass loss. Since there are not enough young clusters of stars available for the calculation of IMF, PDMF is used instead and the results are extrapolated back to IMF. IMF and PDMF can be linked through the "stellar creation function". Stellar creation function is defined as the number of stars per unit volume of space in a mass range and a time interval. In the case that all the main sequence stars have greater lifetimes than the galaxy, IMF and PDMF are equivalent. Similarly, IMF and PDMF are equivalent in brown dwarfs due to their unlimited lifetimes.

The properties and evolution of a star are closely related to its mass, so the IMF is an important diagnostic tool for astronomers studying large quantities of stars. For example, the initial mass of a star is the primary factor of determining its colour, luminosity, radius, radiation spectrum, and quantity of materials and energy it emitted into interstellar space during its lifetime. At low masses, the IMF sets the Milky Way Galaxy mass budget and the number of substellar objects that form. At intermediate masses, the IMF controls chemical enrichment of the interstellar medium. At high masses, the IMF sets the number of core collapse supernovae that occur and therefore the kinetic energy feedback.

The IMF is relatively invariant from one group of stars to another, though some observations suggest that the IMF is different in different environments, and potentially dramatically different in early galaxies.

== Development ==
Initial mass function. The vertical axis is actually not ξ(m)Δm, but a scaled version of ξ(m). For m > 1 M_{☉}, it is (m/M_{☉})^{−2.35}.

The mass of a star can only be directly determined by applying Kepler's third law to a binary star system. However, the number of binary systems that can be directly observed is low, thus not enough samples to estimate the initial mass function. Therefore, the stellar luminosity function is used to derive a mass function (a present-day mass function, PDMF) by applying the mass–luminosity relation. The luminosity function requires accurate determination of distances, and the most straightforward way is by measuring stellar parallax within 20 parsecs from the earth. Although short distances yield a smaller number of samples with greater uncertainty of distances for stars with faint magnitudes (with a magnitude > 12 in the visual band), it reduces the error of distances for nearby stars, and allows accurate determination of binary star systems. Since the magnitude of a star varies with its age, the determination of mass-luminosity relation should also take into account its age. For stars with masses above 0.7 M_{☉}, it takes more than 10 billion years for their magnitude to increase substantially. For low-mass stars with below 0.13 M_{☉}, it takes 5 × 10^{8} years to reach main sequence stars.

The IMF is often stated in terms of a series of power laws, where $N(m) \mathrm{d}m$ (sometimes also represented as $\xi (m) \Delta m$), the number of stars with masses in the range $m$ to $m + \mathrm{d}m$ within a specified volume of space, is proportional to $m^{-\alpha}$, where $\alpha$ is a dimensionless exponent.

Commonly used forms of the IMF are the Kroupa (2001) broken power law and the Chabrier (2003) log-normal.

=== Salpeter (1955) ===
Edwin E. Salpeter is the first astrophysicist who attempted to quantify IMF by applying power law into his equations. His work is based upon the sun-like stars that can be easily observed with great accuracy. Salpeter defined the mass function as the number of stars in a volume of space observed at a time as per logarithmic mass interval. His work enabled a large number of theoretical parameters to be included in the equation while converging all these parameters into an exponent of $\alpha = 2.35$. The Salpeter IMF is
$$\xi (m) \Delta m = \xi_{0} \left(\frac{m}{M_\odot}\right)^{-2.35}\left(\frac{\Delta m}{M_\odot}\right).$$
where $\xi_{0}$ is a constant relating to the local stellar density.

=== Miller–Scalo (1979) ===
Glenn E. Miller and John M. Scalo extended the work of Salpeter, by introducing the log-normal formulation and suggesting that the IMF "flattened" ($\alpha \rightarrow 0$) when stellar masses fell below 1 M_{☉}.

=== Kroupa (2002) ===
After introducing with Christopher Tout and Gerard Gilmore the corrections for unresolved binary stars in the Galactic field in 1991, Pavel Kroupa found $\alpha=2.3$ between 0.5–150 M_{☉}, but introduced $\alpha = 1.3$ between 0.08–0.5 M_{☉} and $\alpha=0.3$ below 0.08 M_{☉}. Based on Galactic-field star counts analysed by Scalo from 1986, the Galactic-field IMF above 1 M_{☉} has $\alpha=2.7$, where binary-star corrections are not significant. The difference above 1 M_{☉} between star forming regions ($\alpha=2.3$) and the Galactic field ($\alpha=2.7$) is explained by the latter being a composite IMF, or integrated galaxy IMF, made from the sum of many star forming regions.

=== Chabrier (2003) ===
Gilles Chabrier gave the following expression for the density of individual stars in the Galactic disk, in units of pc^{−3}:
$$\xi (m) = \frac{0.158}{m\ln(10)} \exp\left[- \frac{(\log(m)-\log(0.08))^2}{2 \times 0.69^2}\right] \quad \text{ for } m < 1,$$
This expression is log-normal, meaning that the logarithm of the mass follows a Gaussian distribution up to 1 M_{☉}.

For stellar systems (namely binaries) in the Galactic field, he gave:
$$\xi (m) = \frac{0.086}{m \ln(10)} \exp \left[- \frac{(\log(m)-\log(0.22))^2}{2 \times 0.57^2} \right] \quad \text{ for } m < 1.$$
The binary fraction differs in different regions.

== Slope ==
The initial mass function is typically graphed on a logarithm scale of log(N) vs log(m). Such plots give approximately straight lines with a slope Γ equal to 1–α. Hence Γ is often called the slope of the initial mass function. The present-day mass function, for coeval formation, has the same slope except that it rolls off at higher masses which have evolved away from the main sequence.

=== Uncertainties ===
There are large uncertainties concerning the substellar region. In particular, the classical assumption of a single IMF covering the whole substellar and stellar mass range is being questioned, in favor of a two-component IMF to account for possible different formation modes for substellar objects—one IMF covering brown dwarfs and very-low-mass stars, and another ranging from the higher-mass brown dwarfs to the most massive stars. This leads to an overlap region approximately between 0.05–0.2 M_{☉} where both formation modes may account for bodies in this mass range.

=== Variation ===
The possible variation of the IMF affects our interpretation of the galaxy signals and the estimation of cosmic star formation history thus is important to consider.

In theory, the IMF should vary with different star-forming conditions. Higher ambient temperature increases the mass of collapsing gas clouds (Jeans mass); lower gas metallicity reduces the radiation pressure thus make the accretion of the gas easier, both lead to more massive stars being formed in a star cluster. The galaxy-wide IMF can be different from the star-cluster scale IMF and may systematically change with the galaxy star formation history.

Measurements of the local universe where single stars can be resolved are consistent with an invariant IMF but the conclusion suffers from large measurement uncertainty due to the small number of massive stars and difficulties in distinguishing binary systems from the single stars. Thus IMF variation effect is not prominent enough to be observed in the local universe. However, recent photometric survey across cosmic time does suggest a potentially systematic variation of the IMF at high redshift.

Systems formed at much earlier times or further from the galactic neighborhood, where star formation activity can be hundreds or even thousands time stronger than the current Milky Way, may give a better understanding. It has been consistently reported both for star clusters and galaxies that there seems to be a systematic variation of the IMF. However, the measurements are less direct. For star clusters the IMF may change over time due to complicated dynamical evolution. (Note: Different mass of stars have different ages, thus modifying the star formation history would modify the present-day mass function, which mimics the effect of modifying the IMF.)

=== Origin of the stellar IMF ===
Recent studies have suggested that filamentary structures in molecular clouds play a crucial role in the initial conditions of star formation and the origin of the stellar IMF. Herschel observations of the California giant molecular cloud show that both the prestellar core mass function (CMF) and the filament line mass function (FLMF) follow power-law distributions at the high-mass end, consistent with the Salpeter power-law IMF. Specifically, the CMF follows $\Delta N/\Delta \log M \propto M^{-1.4 \pm 0.2}$ for masses greater than $1\, M_\odot$, and the FLMF follows $\Delta N/\Delta \log M_{\text{line}} \propto M_{\text{line}}^{-1.5 \pm 0.2}$ for filament line masses greater than $10\, M_\odot \text{pc}^{-1}$. Recent research suggests that the global prestellar CMF in molecular clouds is the result of the integration of CMFs generated by individual thermally supercritical filaments, which indicates a tight connection between the FLMF and the CMF/IMF, supporting the idea that filamentary structures are a critical evolutionary step in establishing a Salpeter-like mass function.
