= Susanne Yelin =

German physicist

Susanne F. Yelin (born 1968) is a German physicist specializing in theoretical quantum optics and known for her work in quantum coherence and superradiance. She is a professor of physics at the University of Connecticut, a professor of physics in residence at Harvard University, and vice director of the Max Planck/Harvard Research Center for Quantum Optics.

== Education and career ==
Yelin earned a diploma in physics from the University of Stuttgart in 1994, and completed her doctorate (Dr. rer. nat.) from LMU Munich in 1998 while also working as a visiting student researcher at Texas A&M University.

After postdoctoral research at the Massachusetts Institute of Technology, Center for Astrophysics | Harvard & Smithsonian, and Solid State Scientific Corporation, she joined the University of Connecticut faculty in 2002. She has also been a research affiliate at the Center for Astrophysics | Harvard & Smithsonian since 2002, and joined Harvard University as a senior research fellow in 2010. At Harvard University she serves as the faculty advisor for the Harvard College Quantum Computing Association, an undergraduate student organization aimed at exploring the interdisciplinary applications of quantum science.

She also acts as a co-editor for the Elsevier scholarly book series Advances in Atomic, Molecular and Optical Physics, a publication dedicated to compiling comprehensive reviews of rapid theoretical and experimental developments in the disciple.

In discussions regarding the future quantum technologies, Yelin has publicly advocated for scientific realism.

== Recognition ==
Yelin was one of three 2013 winners of the Willis E. Lamb Award for Laser Science and Quantum Optics, "for pioneering contributions to the theory of coherence phenomena ranging from super-radiance to ultra-cold molecules".

In 2017 she was named a Fellow of the American Physical Society (APS), after a nomination from the APS Division of Atomic, Molecular & Optical Physics, "for pioneering theoretical work with quantum coherences, such as near-resonant nonlinear quantum optics, for work with hybrid systems, such as molecular and solid state materials, and for work with many-body and cooperative systems and super-radiance".

In 2021 Yelin was named a Fellow of Optica for "pioneering work in theoretical quantum optics with atoms, molecules, and condensed matter, with many-body, nonlinear, and cooperative systems."
