= YAMBO code =

Yambo
- Original author: Andrea Marini
- Developers: Davide Sangalli, Claudio Attaccalite, Andrea Ferretti, Henrique Miranda, Myrta Gruning, Conor Hogan, Daniele Varsano, Dario A. Leon, Fulvio Paleari, Igancio Alliati, Nicola Spallanzani, Nalabothula Muralidhar, Elena Molteni, Alberto Guandalini, Pedro Melo, Ryan McMillan, Fabio Affinito, Alejandro Molina-Sanchez
- Release: 2008; 18 years ago
- Stable release: 5.3.0 / 16 January 2025; 20 months ago
- Written in: Fortran, C
- Operating system: Unix, Unix-like
- Platform: x86, x86-64
- Available in: English
- Type: Many-body theory
- License: GPL
- Website: www.yambo-code.eu
- Repository: github.com/yambo-code/yambo

Yambo is a computer software package for studying many-body theory aspects of solids and of molecular systems. It calculates the excited state properties of physical systems from first principles, e.g., from quantum mechanics law without the use of empirical data. It is an open-source software released under the GNU General Public License (GPL). However the main development repository is private and only a subset of the features available in the private repository are cloned into the public repository and thus distributed. The name Yambo does not stand for anything in particular; an interpretation thereof as Yet Another Many-Body cOde (or even Yet Another Many-Body Oracle) would be ultimately unofficial and up to the user's willingness or preference.

== Excited state properties ==
Yambo can calculate:

- Quasiparticle energies: plasmon pole, COHSEX approximation, or real-axis
- Lifetimes within the GW approximation
- Optical absorption: RPA, Bethe Salpeter with or without Tamm-Dancoff approximation, TDDFT in TD-LDA or LRC
- Electron energy loss spectroscopy
- Dynamical polarizability
- electron-phonon coupling (static and dynamic perturbation theory)
- magneto optical properties
- surface spectroscopy

== Physical systems ==
Yambo can treat molecules and periodic systems (both metallic an insulating) in three dimensions (crystalline solids) two dimensions (surfaces) and one dimension (e.g., nanotubes, nanowires, polymer chains). It can also handle collinear (i.e., spin-polarized wave functions) and non-collinear (spinors) magnetic systems.

Typical systems are of the size of 10-100 atoms, or 10-400 electrons, per unit cell in the case of periodic systems.

== Theoretical methods and approximations ==
Yambo relies on many-body perturbation theory and time-dependent density functional theory. Quasiparticle energies are calculated within the GW approximation for the self energy. Optical properties are calculated either by solving the Bethe–Salpeter equation or by using the adiabatic local density approximation within time-dependent density functional theory.

== Numerical details ==
Yambo uses a plane waves basis set to represent the electronic (single-particle) wavefunctions. Core electrons are described with norm-conserving pseudopotentials. The choice of a plane-wave basis set enforces the periodicity of the systems. Isolated systems, and systems that are periodic in only one or two directions can be treated by using a supercell approach. For such systems Yambo offers two numerical techniques for the treatment of the Coulomb integrals: the cut-off and the random-integration method.

== Technical details ==
- Yambo is interfaced with plane-wave density-functional codes: ABINIT, PWscf, CPMD and with the ETSF-io library. The utilities that interface these codes with Yambo are distributed along with the main program.
- The source code is written in Fortran 95 and C
- The code is parallelized using MPI running libraries

== User interface ==
- Yambo has a command line user interface. Invoking the program with specific option generates the input with default values for the parameters consistent with the present data on the system.
- A postprocessing tool, distributed along with the main program, helps with the analysis and visualization of the results.

== System requirements, portability ==
- Unix based systems
- Compilers for the programming languages Fortran 95 and C
- optional: PGI Fortran compiler for GPU version (starting from 4.5 release)
- optional: netcdf, fftw, mpi (for parallel execution), etsf-io, libxc, hdf5
- Hardware requirements depend very much on the physical system under study and the chosen level of theory. For random-access memory (RAM) the requirements may vary from less than 1 GB to few GBs, depending on the problem.

== Learning Yambo ==
The Yambo team provides a wiki web-page with a list of tutorials and lecture notes. On the yambo web-site there is also a list of all thesis done with the code.

== Non-distributed part ==
Part of the YAMBO code is kept under a private repository. These are the features implemented and not yet distributed:

- total energy using adiabatic-connection fluctuation-dissipation theorem
- magnetic field
- self-consistent GW
- dynamical Bethe–Salpeter
- finite-momentum Bethe-Salpeter
- real-time spectroscopy
- advanced kernels for time-dependent density functional theory (Nanoquanta kernel).
