= Liuyan Zhao =

Chinese-American physicist

Liuyan Zhao is a Chinese and American experimental condensed matter physicist whose research uses optical spectroscopy and scanning tunneling microscopy to study the electronic and magnetic properties of quantum materials. She is a professor of physics at the University of Michigan.

== Education and career ==
Zhao received a bachelor's degree in physics from the University of Science and Technology of China in 2008. Next, she went to Columbia University for graduate study in physics, where she received a master's degree in 2010 and completed her Ph.D. in 2013.

She became a Prize Postdoctoral Fellow in physics at the California Institute of Technology from 2013 to 2016. In 2017, she joined the University of Michigan as an assistant professor of physics. She was promoted to associate professor in 2022 and professor in 2026, and has been a QRI Fellow at the Michigan Quantum Research Institute since 2024.

== Research highlights ==
During Zhao’s independent research career at the University of Michigan, her group has developed and applied symmetry-sensitive optical techniques to study phase transitions in solids. The group also creates and investigates new material platforms that host novel phases and enable unconventional physical responses. Her research highlights include detection of ferro-rotational (or ferro-axial) order, study of moiré magnetism, investigation of vestigial order in 2D magnets, among others.

== Recognition ==
Zhao received the National Science Foundation CAREER Award in 2018, the Air Force Office of Scientific Research Young Inveestigator Award in 2020, a Sloan Research Fellowship in 2021, and the Presidential Early Career Award for Scientists and Engineers in 2025.

She was a 2019 recipient of the Bryan R. Coles Prize of the International Conference on Strongly Correlated Electron Systems, and the 2022 Macronix Prize of the International Organization of Chinese Physicists and Astronomers. The University of Michigan gave her their Henry Russel Award in 2023 and their Elizabeth Caroline Crosby Award in 2025.

Zhao was the recipient of the Mildred Dresselhaus Award 2023 (Junior Prize) of the University of Hamburg, and visited the university as Mildred Dresselhaus Guest Professor. She was named as a Fellow of the American Physical Society (APS) in 2025, after a nomination from the APS Division of Condensed Matter Physics, "for outstanding experimental contributions in detecting multipolar orders with nonlinear optics and designing two-dimensional magnetic multipolar phases with twisted moiré magnets".
