= Feng Wang (physicist) =

American physicist

Feng Wang is an American physicist, currently at University of California, Berkeley and an Elected Fellow of the American Physical Society.

== Education ==
Wang received a B.A. from Fudan University, Shanghai, in 1999 and a Ph.D. from Columbia University in 2004.
