= Junichiro Kono =

Doctor of Philosophy Junichiro Kono
- Education: University of Tokyo; University at Buffalo
- Awards: Andrew Heiskell Award
- Scientific career
- Fields: Physics; Electrical engineering
- Workplaces: University of California, Santa Barbara; Stanford University; Rice University

Junichiro Kono is a professor in the Departments of Electrical and Computer Engineering, Physics and Astronomy, and Materials Science and NanoEngineering, at Rice University. Since 2024, he is the director of the Smalley-Curl Institute.

== Early life ==
Junichiro Kono received his B.S. and M.S. degrees in applied physics from the University of Tokyo in 1990 and 1992, respectively, and completed his Ph.D. in physics from the State University of New York at Buffalo in 1995. He was a postdoctoral research associate in condensed matter physics at the University of California Santa Barbara from 1995-1997, and the W. W. Hansen Experimental Physics Laboratory Fellow in the Department of Physics at Stanford University from 1997-2000. He joined the Department of Electrical and Computer Engineering of Rice University in 2000 as an assistant professor and was promoted to associate professor in 2005 and to professor in 2009. He is currently a professor in the departments of electrical & computer engineering, physics & astronomy, and materials science & nanoengineering at Rice University. His research focuses on optical studies of condensed matter systems and photonic applications of nanosystems, including semiconductor nanostructures and carbon-based nanomaterials. He has made a number of pioneering contributions to the diverse fields of semiconductor optics, terahertz spectroscopy and devices, ultrafast and quantum optics, and condensed matter physics. In 2009 he was named a Fellow of the American Physical Society and, in 2015, he was elected a Fellow of the Optical Society of America.
