= Bethe–Salpeter equation =

Equation for two-body bound states

The Bethe–Salpeter equation (BSE, named after Hans Bethe and Edwin Salpeter) is an integral equation, the solution of which describes the structure of a relativistic two-body (particles) bound state in a covariant formalism quantum field theory (QFT). The equation was first published in 1950 at the end of a paper by Yoichiro Nambu, but without derivation.

A graphical representation of the Bethe–Salpeter equation, showing its recursive definition

Due to its common application in several branches of theoretical physics, the Bethe–Salpeter equation appears in many forms. One form often used in high energy physics is

$$\Gamma(P,p) =\int\!\frac{d^4k}{(2\pi)^4} \; K(P,p,k)\, S(k-\tfrac{P}{2}) \,\Gamma(P,k)\, S(k+\tfrac{P}{2})$$

where $\Gamma$ is the Bethe–Salpeter amplitude (BSA), $K$ the Green's function representing the interaction and $S$ the dressed propagators of the two constituent particles.

In quantum theory, bound states are composite physical systems with lifetime significantly longer than the time scale of the interaction breaking their structure (otherwise the physical systems under consideration are called resonances), thus allowing ample time for constituents to interact. By accounting all possible interactions that can occur between the two constituents, the BSE is a tool to calculate properties of deep-bound states. Its solution $\Gamma$, the BSA, then encodes the structure of the bound state under consideration.

As it can be derived via identifying bound-states with poles in the S-matrix of the 4-point function involving the constituent particles, the equation is related to the quantum-field description of scattering processes applying Green's functions.

As a general-purpose tool the applications of the BSE can be found in most quantum field theories. Examples include positronium (bound state of an electron–positron pair), excitons (bound states of an electron–hole pairs), and mesons (as quark-antiquark bound states).

Even for simple systems such as the positronium, the equation cannot be solved exactly under quantum electrodynamics (QED), despite its exact formulation. A reduction of the equation can be achieved without the exact solution. In the case where particle-pair production can be ignored, if one of the two fermion constituent is significantly more massive than the other, the system is simplified into the Dirac equation for the light particle under the external potential of the heavy one.

== Derivation ==
The starting point for the derivation of the Bethe–Salpeter equation is the two-particle (or four point) Dyson equation

$$G = S_1\,S_2 + S_1\,S_2\, K_{12}\, G$$

in momentum space, where "G" is the two-particle Green function $\langle\Omega| \phi_1 \,\phi_2\, \phi_3\, \phi_4 |\Omega\rangle$, "S" are the free propagators and "K" is an interaction kernel, which contains all possible interactions between the two particles. The crucial step is now, to assume that bound states appear as poles in the Green function. One assumes, that two particles come together and form a bound state with mass "M", this bound state propagates freely, and then the bound state splits in its two constituents again. Therefore, one introduces the Bethe–Salpeter wave function $\Psi = \langle\Omega| \phi_1 \,\phi_2|\psi\rangle$, which is a transition amplitude of two constituents $\phi_i$ into a bound state $\psi$, and then makes an Ansatz for the Green function in the vicinity of the pole as

$$G \approx \frac{\Psi\;\bar\Psi}{P^2-M^2},$$

where P is the total momentum of the system. One sees, that if for this momentum the equation $P^2 = M^2$ holds, which is exactly the Einstein energy-momentum relation (with the Four-momentum $P_\mu = \left(E/c,\vec p \right)$ and $P^2 = P_\mu\,P^\mu$ ), the four-point Green function contains a pole. If one plugs that Ansatz into the Dyson equation above, and sets the total momentum "P" such that the energy-momentum relation holds, on both sides of the term a pole appears.

$$\frac{\Psi\;\bar\Psi}{P^2-M^2} = S_1\,S_2 +S_1\,S_2\, K_{12}\frac{\Psi\;\bar\Psi}{P^2-M^2}$$

Comparing the residues yields

$$\Psi=S_1\,S_2\, K_{12}\Psi, \,$$

This is already the Bethe–Salpeter equation, written in terms of the Bethe–Salpeter wave functions. To obtain the above form one introduces the Bethe–Salpeter amplitudes "Γ"

$$\Psi = S_1\,S_2\,\Gamma$$

and gets finally

$$\Gamma= K_{12}\,S_1\,S_2\,\Gamma$$

which is written down above, with the explicit momentum dependence.

== Rainbow-ladder approximation ==
A graphical representation of the Bethe–Salpeter equation in Ladder-approximation

In principle the interaction kernel K contains all possible two-particle-irreducible interactions that can occur between the two constituents. In order to carry out practical calculations one has to model it by choosing a subset of the interactions. As in quantum field theories, interaction is described via the exchange of particles (e.g. photons in QED, or gluons in quantum chromodynamics), other than contact interactions the most simple interaction is modeled by the exchange of only one of these force-carrying particles with a known propagator.

As the Bethe–Salpeter equation sums up the interaction infinitely many times from a perturbative view point, the resulting Feynman graph resembles the form of a ladder (or rainbow), hence the name of this approximation.

While in QED the ladder approximation caused problems with crossing symmetry and gauge invariance, indicating the inclusion of crossed-ladder terms. In quantum chromodynamics (QCD) this approximation is frequently used phenomenologically to calculate hadron mass and its structure in terms of Bethe—Salpeter amplitudes and Faddeev amplitudes, a well-known Ansatz of which is proposed by Maris and Tandy. Such an Ansatz for the dressed quark-gluon vertex within the rainbow-ladder truncation respects chiral symmetry and its dynamical breaking, which therefore is an important modeling of the strong nuclear interaction. As an example the structure of pions can be solved applying the Maris—Tandy Ansatz from the Bethe—Salpeter equation in Euclidean space.

== Normalization ==
As for solutions of any homogeneous equation, that of the Bethe–Salpeter equation is determined up to a numerical factor. This factor has to be specified by a certain normalization condition. For the Bethe–Salpeter amplitudes this is usually done by demanding probability conservation (similar to the normalization of the quantum mechanical wave function), which corresponds to the equation

$$2 P_\mu = \bar\Gamma \left( \frac{\partial}{\partial P_\mu} \left( S_1 \otimes S_2 \right) - S_1\,S_2\, \left(\frac{\partial}{\partial P_\mu}\,K\right)\, S_1\,S_2\right) \Gamma$$

Normalizations to the charge and energy-momentum tensor of the bound state lead to the same equation. In the rainbow-ladder approximation this Interaction kernel does not depend on the total momentum of the Bethe–Salpeter amplitude, in which case the second term of the normalization condition vanishes. An alternative normalization based on the eigenvalue of the corresponding linear operator was derived by Nakanishi.

== Solution in the Minkowski space ==
The Bethe—Salpeter equation applies to all kinematic region of the Bethe—Salpeter amplitude. Consequently, it determines the amplitudes where the functions are not continuous. Such singularities are usually located when the constituent momentum is timelike, which are not directly accessible from Euclidean-space solutions of this equation. Instead one develop methods to solve these types of integral equations directly in the timelike region. In the case of scalar bound states through a scalar-particle exchange in the rainbow-ladder truncation, the Bethe—Salpeter equation in the Minkowski space can be solved with the assistance of Nakanishi integral representation.

== See also ==
- ABINIT
- Araki–Sucher correction
- Breit equation
- Lippmann–Schwinger equation
- Schwinger–Dyson equation
- Two-body Dirac equations
- YAMBO code

== Bibliography ==
Many modern quantum field theory textbooks and a few articles provide pedagogical accounts for the Bethe–Salpeter equation's context and uses. See:

- W. Greiner, J. Reinhardt (2003). Quantum Electrodynamics (3rd ed.). Springer. ISBN 978-3-540-44029-1.
- Z.K. Silagadze (1998). "Wick–Cutkosky model: An introduction". arXiv:hep-ph/9803307.

Still a good introduction is given by the review article of Nakanishi

- N. Nakanishi (1969). "A general survey of the theory of the Bethe–Salpeter equation". Progress of Theoretical Physics Supplement. 43: 1–81. Bibcode:1969PThPS..43....1N. doi:10.1143/PTPS.43.1.

For historical aspects, see

- E.E. Salpeter (2008). "Bethe–Salpeter equation (origins)". Scholarpedia. 3 (11): 7483. arXiv:0811.1050. Bibcode:2008SchpJ...3.7483S. doi:10.4249/scholarpedia.7483. S2CID 32913032.

== External links to codes where the Bethe-Salpeter equation is coded ==
- Yambo - plane-wave pseudopotential
- BerkeleyGW – plane-wave pseudopotential
- ExC - plane-wave pseudopotential
- Fiesta - Gaussian all-electron
- Abinit - plane-wave pseudopotential
- VASP - plane-wave pseudopotential

For a more comprehensive list of first principles codes see here: List of quantum chemistry and solid-state physics software
