= Qualcomm Snapdragon =

System-on-a-chip semiconductor product line

Snapdragon

General information
- Launched: November 2007
- Marketed by: Qualcomm
- Designed by: Qualcomm
- Common manufacturer: TSMC Samsung

Physical specifications
- Memory (RAM): LPDDR SDRAM
- GPU: Adreno graphics

Architecture and classification
- Application: Smartphone; Tablet; Laptop; Smartwatch; Embedded system; Virtual reality headset; Bluetooth audio

Products, models, variants
- Core name: Kryo CPU Oryon CPU Adreno GPU Hexagon DSP Spectra ISP Snapdragon Modem FastConnect WiFi
- Model: List of Qualcomm Snapdragon processors
- Brand names: Snapdragon X; Snapdragon G; Snapdragon XR; Snapdragon AR; Snapdragon 8; Snapdragon 7; Snapdragon 6; Snapdragon 4; Snapdragon 2; Snapdragon W; Snapdragon S

Snapdragon is the brand name for Qualcomm's integrated circuit (IC) products. These include systems on chip (SoCs), standalone cellular modems, and wireless network interface controllers (NICs).

Snapdragon-branded SoCs are designed to power embedded systems, such as smartphones, laptops, and vehicles. They typically consist of a central processing unit (CPU), a graphics processor (GPU), various digital signal processors (DSP), and optionally, a cellular modem, combined into a single package for compactness. They can run operating systems with graphical user interfaces, like Android and Windows, and can process a variety of signals, like speech from a microphone, images from a built-in camera, and radio waves from Wi-Fi and Bluetooth connections.

The integrated CPU is based on the ARM architecture, and consists of one or more cores. These are either licensed IP cores developed by ARM Holdings, or in-house cores developed by Qualcomm itself. More than one type of core may be used at once, such as in a big.LITTLE configuration. The integrated Adreno GPU and cellular modem, when present, are always developed in-house.

== History ==
=== Pre-release ===
Qualcomm announced it was developing the Scorpion central processing unit (CPU) in November 2007. The Snapdragon system on chip (SoC) was announced in November 2006 and included the Scorpion processor, as well as other semiconductors. This also included Qualcomm's first custom Hexagon digital signal processor (DSP).

According to a Qualcomm spokesperson, it was named Snapdragon, because "Snap and Dragon sounded fast and fierce." The following month, Qualcomm acquired Airgo Networks for an undisclosed amount; it said Airgo's 802.11a/b/g and 802.11n Wi-Fi technology would be integrated with the Snapdragon product suite. Early versions of Scorpion had a processor core design similar to the Cortex-A8.

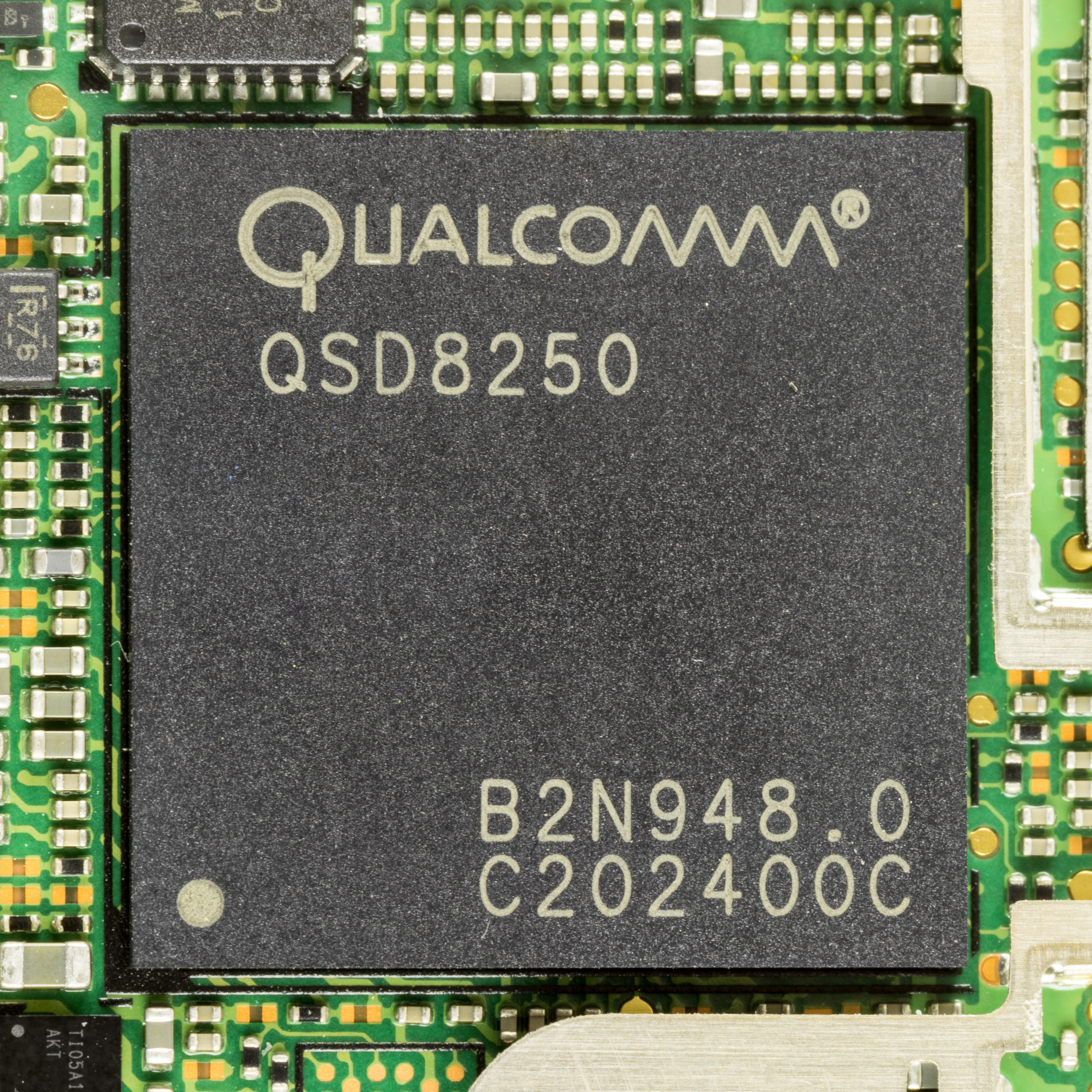
Qualcomm QSD8250

=== 2007–2013 ===
The first Snapdragon was released in November 2007. CNET noted its relatively high 1 GHz CPU clock speed as the product's "claim to fame," when contemporary smartphone processors were commonly 500 MHz. The product can output display at up to 720p resolution, render 3D graphics, and supports up to a 12-megapixel camera. By November 2008, 15 device manufacturers had embedded Snapdragon chips in their consumer electronics products.

In November 2008, a processor and netbook were showcased as a tech demo. The processor consumed less power than the contemporary Intel Atom Z500. The netbook used a 1.5 GHz processor and was intended for developing markets.

In collaboration with Sun, Java SE received Snapdragon-specific optimizations in May 2009. Qualcomm started using 45 nm process for SoC productions in late 2009.

In June 2010, Snapdragon chips were incorporated into 120 product designs in development. The company announced the MSM8960 for LTE networks that November.

Apple had a dominant market position for smartphones at the time and did not incorporate Snapdragon into any of its products. The success of Snapdragon therefore relied on competing Android phones.

Support for the Windows Phone 7 operating system was added to Snapdragon in October 2010.

By 2011 Snapdragon was embedded in Hewlett Packard's WebOS devices and had a 50% market share of a $7.9 billion smartphone processor market.

As of July 2014 Qualcomm's Snapdragon chips were embedded in 41% of smartphones.

Snapdragon chips are also used in Android-based smartwatches, and in vehicles like the Maserati Quattroporte and Cadillac XTS.

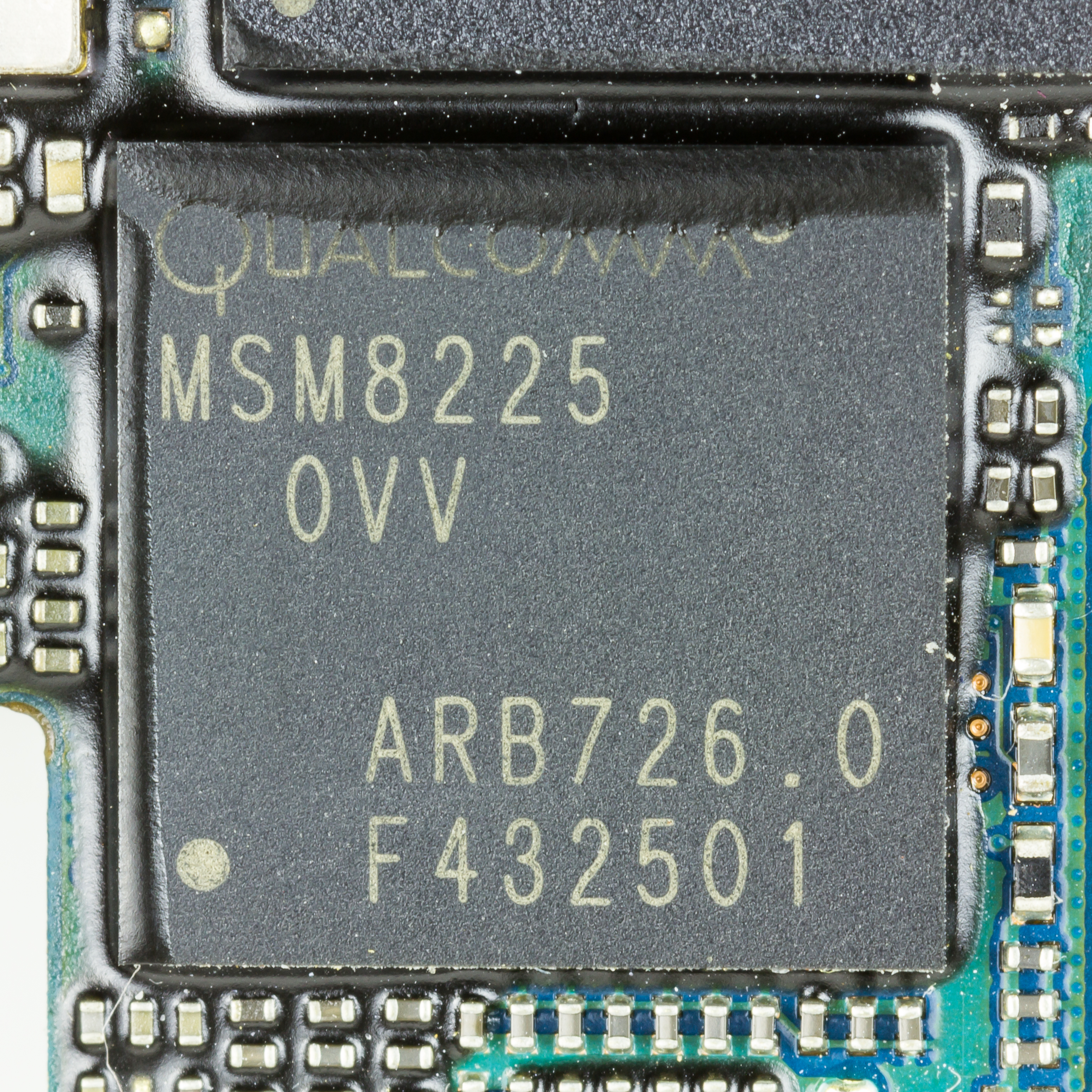
Snapdragon S4 Play Processor - Qualcomm MSM8225

In early 2011, Qualcomm announced Krait, an in-house CPU microarchitecture design supporting the ARM v7 instruction set. SoCs featuring Krait were named S4, supporting asynchronous symmetrical multi-processing (aSMP), meaning each processor core adjusted its clock speed and voltage based on the device's activity in order to optimize battery usage. Prior models were renamed to S1, S2 and S3 to distinguish between each generation.

The S4-based generation of Snapdragon SoCs began shipping to product manufacturers with the MSM8960 in February 2012. In an overall system benchmark, the 8960 obtained a score of 907, compared to 528 and 658 for the Galaxy Nexus and HTC Rezound respectively. In a Quadrant benchmark test, which assesses raw processing power, a dual-core Krait processor had a score of 4,952, whereas the quad-core Tegra 3 scored just under 4,000. The quad-core version, APQ8064, was made available in July 2012. It was the first Snapdragon SoC to use Qualcomm's Adreno 320 graphics processing unit (GPU).

In July 2011 Qualcomm acquired certain assets from GestureTek in order to incorporate its gesture recognition intellectual property into Snapdragon SoCs. In mid-2012 Qualcomm announced the Snapdragon software development kit (SDK) for Android devices at the Uplinq developer conference.It also collaborated with Microsoft to optimize Windows Phone 8 for Snapdragon semiconductors.

As of July 2014, the market share of Android phones had grown to 84.6 percent, and Qualcomm's Snapdragon chips powered 41% of smartphones.

Snapdragon SoCs were also used in most Windows phones and most phones entering the market in mid-2013.

On the announcement of Snapdragon 800 in 2013 Consumer Electronics Show, Qualcomm renamed their prior models to the 200, 400 and 600 series.

=== 2014–present ===
The debut of Apple's 64-bit A7 chip in the iPhone 5S forced Qualcomm to rush out a competing 64-bit solution, despite the capable performance of the Snapdragon 800/801/805, since their existing Krait cores were only 32-bit. The first 64-bit SoCs, the Snapdragon 808 and 810, were rushed to market and released in 2014 using Cortex-A57 and Cortex-A53 cores. They suffered from overheating problems and throttling, particularly the 810, which led to Samsung ditching Snapdragon for its Galaxy S6 flagship phone.

The entry-level 200 series was expanded with six new processors using 28 nanometer manufacturing and dual or quad-core options in June 2013.

In February 2015, Qualcomm re-branded its stand-alone modem products under the Snapdragon name; they were distinguished from SoCs using the "x" designation, such as the X7 or X12 modem.

In early 2016, Qualcomm launched the Snapdragon 820, an ARM 64-bit quad-core processor using in-house designed Kryo cores. A higher clocked variant is available as the Snapdragon 821. The SoC uses Samsung's 14 nanometer FinFET process. Together released is the Neural Processing Engine SDK supporting AI acceleration.

The first Snapdragon modem for 5G networks, the X50, was announced in October 2016 and released in late 2019.

The octa-core Snapdragon 835 SoC was announced on 17 November 2016. It uses modified Cortex-A73 and A53 cores and is built using Samsung's 10 nanometer FinFET process.

At Computex 2017 in May, Qualcomm and Microsoft announced plans to launch Snapdragon-based laptops running Windows 10. Qualcomm partnered with HP, Lenovo, and Asus to release slim portables and 2-in-1 devices powered by the Snapdragon 835.

Snapdragon 845 uses updated Cortex-A75 and A55 CPU, and the same 10-nanometer manufacturing process as 835.

The 7 series was introduced in early 2018, targeting pricing and performances between the 6 and 8 series.

As of 2018, Asus, HP, and Lenovo have begun selling laptops with Snapdragon-based CPUs running Windows 10 on ARM under the name "Always Connected PCs".

The Snapdragon 855 was released in 2019 and was built on TSMC's 7 nanometer process.

The Snapdragon 865 supported 5G cellular network through a separate X55 modem. The 765 has an integrated 5G modem.

The Snapdragon 888 announced in December 2020 is the first Qualcomm SoC to feature ARM's Cortex-X series CPU architecture.

NASA's Ingenuity helicopter, which landed on Mars in 2021, has a Snapdragon 801 processor integrated onboard.

The Snapdragon 8 Gen 2 added support for Wi-Fi 7, AV1 playback, and Ray tracing.

The Snapdragon 8 Elite Gen 5 added support for SVE and SME.

== Products ==
Snapdragon system on chip products typically include a graphics processing unit (GPU), a global positioning system (GPS) and an (optional) cellular modem integrated into a single package. It includes hardware that operates graphics, video, and photo capture. Cellular modems branded under Snapdragon start their model name with the letter X, such as the X50, while NICs start theirs with "FastConnect".

The current Snapdragon naming scheme was implemented after the announcement of Snapdragon 800 family in 2013. Models prior to it were renamed to the 200, 400 or 600 series. The former two targeting entry-level products, while the 600 and 800 targeting mid-range and high-end products, respectively.

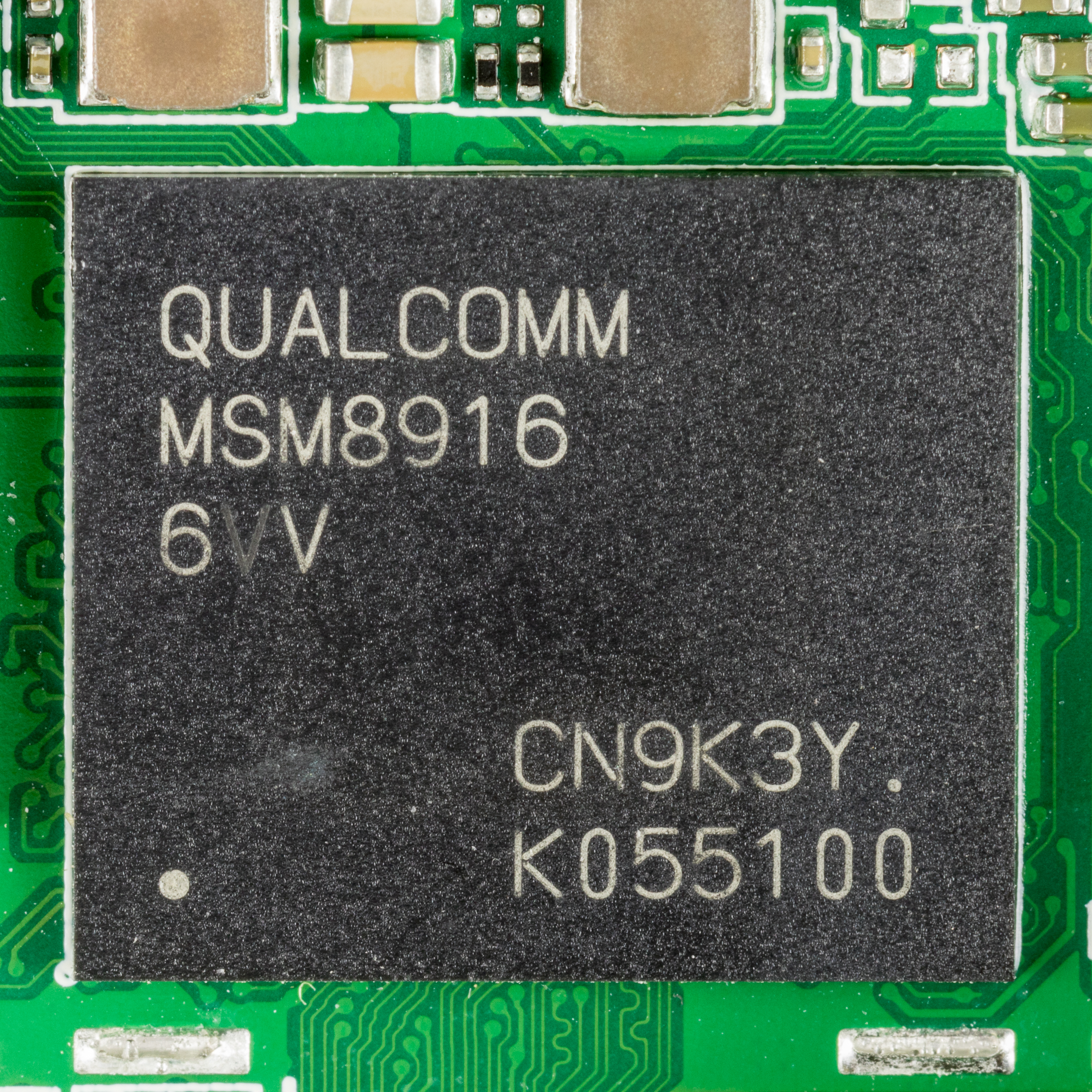
A surface-mount MSM8916 on a printed circuit board (PCB), showing the outer surface of its plastic packaging, with laser-engraved model numbers. This SoC is marketed as the Snapdragon 410.

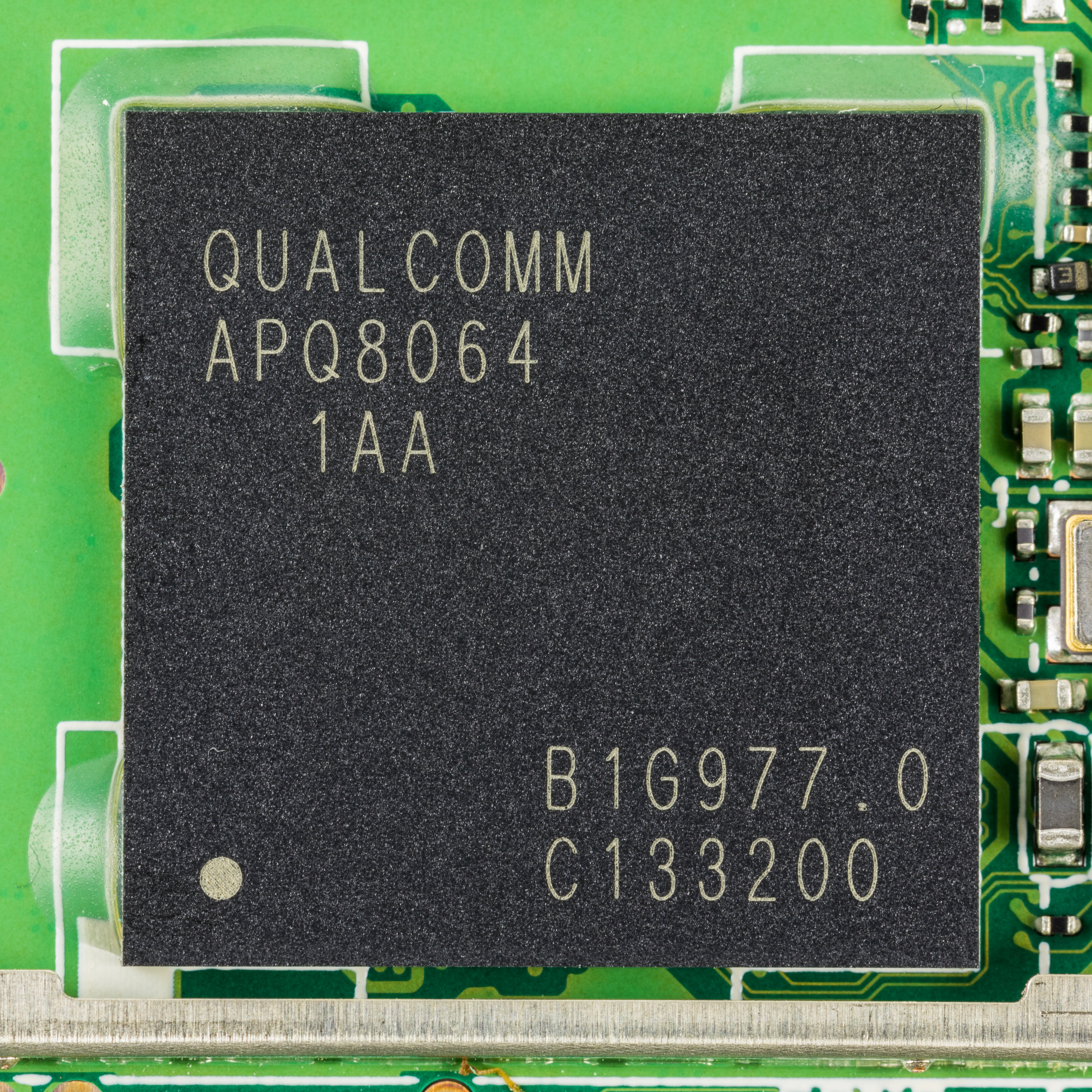
The APQ-series SoC does not feature an on-chip cellular modem. This APQ8064, for example, requires an external modem; it was marketed as the Snapdragon 600.

The X50 cellular modem is the first Snapdragon to support 5G.

The 8cx-series of SoCs are designed for Windows laptops, with its first chip released around 2019. Compared to its smartphone-oriented twins, 8cx typically has larger die area and targets higher power consumption levels.

== Sponsorships ==
Snapdragon is the primary shirt sponsor for English football club Manchester United starting with the 2024–25 season, replacing the German company TeamViewer. The brand also holds naming rights for the Snapdragon Stadium in San Diego.
