= GestureTek =

- Founded: 1986
- Founder: Canadians Vincent John Vincent and Francis MacDougall
- Headquarters: Silicon Valley, California
- Website: gesturetek.com

GestureTek is an American-based interactive technology company headquartered in Silicon Valley, California, with offices in Toronto and Ottawa, Ontario and Asia.

== Founding ==
Founded in 1986 by Canadians Vincent John Vincent and Francis MacDougall, this privately held company develops and licenses gesture recognition software based on computer vision techniques. The partners invented video gesture control in 1986 and received their base patent in 1996 for the GestPoint video gesture control system. GestPoint technology is a camera-enabled video tracking software system that translates hand and body movement into computer control. The system enables users to navigate and control interactive multi-media and menu-based content, engage in virtual reality game play, experience immersion in an augmented reality environment or interact with a consumer device (such a television, mobile phone or set top box) without using touch-based peripherals. Similar companies include gesture recognition specialist LM3LABS based in Tokyo, Japan.

== Technology ==
GestureTek's gesture interface applications include multi-touch and 3D camera tracking. GestureTek's multi-touch technology powers the multi-touch table in Melbourne's Eureka Tower. A GestureTek multi-touch table with object recognition is found at the New York City Visitors Center. Telefónica has a multi-touch window with technology from GestureTek. GestureTek's 3D tracking technology is used in a 3D television prototype from Hitachi and various digital signage and display solutions based on 3D interaction.

== Patents ==
GestureTek currently has 8 patents awarded, including: 5,534,917 (Video Gesture Control Motion Detection); 7,058,204 (Multiple Camera Control System, Point to Control Base Patent); 7,421,093 (Multiple Camera Tracking System for Interfacing With an Application); 7,227,526 (Stereo Camera Control, 3D-Vision Image Control System); 7,379,563 (Two-Handed Movement Tracker Tracking Bi-Manual Movements); 7,379,566 (Optical Flow-Based Tilt Sensor For Phone Tilt Control); 7,389,591 (Phone Tilt for Typing & Menus/Orientation-Sensitive Signal Output); 7,430,312 (Five Camera 3D Face Capture).

GestureTek's software and patents have been licensed by Microsoft for the Xbox 360, Sony for the EyeToy, NTT DoCoMo for their mobile phones and Hasbro for the ION Educational Gaming System. In addition to software provision, GestureTek also fabricates interactive gesture control display systems with natural user interface for interactive advertising, games and presentations.

In addition, GestureTek's natural user interface virtual reality system has been the subject of research by universities and hospitals for its application in both physical therapy and physical rehabilitation.

In 2008, GestureTek received the Mobile Innovation Global Award from the GSMA for its software-based, gesture-controlled user interface for mobile games and applications. The technology is used by Java platform integration providers and mobile developers. Katamari Damacy is one example of a gesture control mobile game powered by GestureTek software.

== Competitors ==
Other companies in the industry of interactive projections for marketing and retail experiences include Po-motion Inc., Touchmagix and LM3LABS.
