= LM3LABS =

Motion control start-up

LM3LABS Corporation
- Industry: Technology, software
- Founded: Tokyo, Japan, (2004)
- Headquarters: Tokyo, Japan; Sophia-Antipolis, France; Singapore,
- Area served: Worldwide
- Key people: Yumiko Misaki (CEO), Nicolas Loeillot (COO)
- Products: Computer vision, sensor, software technology, cloud computing
- Website: www.lm3labs.com

LM3LABS is a start-up company that develops hardware and software for motion-based control of computers.

== History ==
LM3Labs was founded in 2004 to commercialize products that use technologies developed in part at the French National Centre for Scientific Research (CNRS). These technologies use finger tracking, gesture interaction, body interaction, and eye and face recognition. The purpose is to provide interaction with computer systems by gestures instead of through hardware such as keyboards and mice. The prototype installation was installed in the executive showroom at the headquarters of mobile phone operator NTT DoCoMo.

== Computer interactivity ==
The technologies developed by LM3LABS combine active and passive gesture recognition with displays to present and control information. One system, called Catchyoo, controls digital signage to track user interaction with advertisements. The company has also introduced AirStrike, which allows touchless gesture control of computers such moving a window or turning a page. They have also demonstrated combining Airstrike with a holographic display to create an interactive hologram.
