= Colloquium Lectures (AMS) =

Annual session of lectures

The Colloquium Lecture of the American Mathematical Society is a special annual session of lectures.

== History ==
The origins of the Colloquium Lectures date back to the 1893 International Congress of Mathematics, held in connection with the Chicago World's Fair, where the German mathematician Felix Klein gave the opening address. After the Congress, Klein was invited by one of its organiser, his former student Henry Seely White, to deliver a two-week-long series of lectures at Northwestern University in Evanston.

In February 1896, White proposed in a letter to Thomas Fiske to repeat the experience of the Evanston lectures, by organising a series of longer talks "for increasing the utility of the American Mathematical Society". The two of them, together with E. H. Moore, William Osgood, Frank Cole, Alexander Ziwet, and Frank Morley, wrote later an open letter to the AMS, asking the society to sponsor an annual week-long series of Colloquium lectures focussing on a specific mathematical area, in order to complement the traditional shorter talks.

The first official Colloquium Lectures were held in September 1896, after the AMS Summer Meetings in Buffalo, New York, and consisted of two independent series of lectures given by James Pierpont and Maxime Bôcher. A synopse of their lectures was published in the Bulletin of the AMS; starting from the second Colloquium in 1898, the lectures have been published entirely in book form in the AMS Colloquium Publications series.

== List of Colloquium Lectures ==
- 1896 James Pierpont (Yale University): Galois's theory of equations.
- 1896 Maxime Bôcher (Harvard University): Linear differential equations and their applications.
- 1898 William Fogg Osgood (Harvard University): Selected topics in the theory of functions.
- 1898 Arthur Gordon Webster (Clark University): The partial differential equations of wave propagation.
- 1901 Oskar Bolza (University of Chicago): The simplest type of problems in the calculus of variations.
- 1901 Ernest William Brown (Haverford College): Modern methods of treating dynamical problems, and in particular the problem of three bodies.
- 1903 Henry Seely White (Northwestern University): Linear systems of curves on algebraic surfaces.
- 1903 Frederick S. Woods (Massachusetts Institute of Technology): Forms of non-euclidean space.
- 1903 Edward Burr Van Vleck (Wesleyan University): Selected topics in the theory of divergent series and continued fractions.
- 1906 E. H. Moore (University of Chicago): On the theory of bilinear functional operations.
- 1906 Ernest Julius Wilczynski (University of California, Berkeley): Projective differential geometry.
- 1906 Max Mason (Yale University): Selected topics in the theory of boundary value problems of differential equations.
- 1909 Gilbert Ames Bliss (University of Chicago): Fundamental existence theorems.
- 1909 Edward Kasner (Columbia University): Differential-geometric aspects of dynamics.
- 1913 Leonard E. Dickson (University of Chicago): On invariants and the theory of numbers.
- 1913 William Fogg Osgood (Harvard University): Topics in the theory of functions of several complex variables.
- 1916 Griffith C. Evans (Université Rice): Functionals and their applications, selected topics including integral equations.
- 1916 Oswald Veblen (Princeton University): Analysis situs.
- 1920 George David Birkhoff (Harvard University): Dynamical systems.
- 1920 Forest Ray Moulton (University of Chicago): Topics from the theory of functions of infinitely many variables.
- 1925 Luther P. Eisenhart (Princeton University): Non-Riemannian geometry.
- 1925 Dunham Jackson (University of Minnesota): The Theory of Approximations.
- 1927 Eric Temple Bell (California Institute of Technology): Algebraic arithmetic.
- 1927 Anna Pell Wheeler (Bryn Mawr College): The theory of quadratic forms in infinitely many variables and applications.
- 1928 Arthur Byron Coble (University of Illinois): The determination of the tritangent planes of the space sextic of genus four.
- 1929 Robert Lee Moore (University of Texas): Foundations of point set theory.
- 1930 Solomon Lefschetz (Princeton University): Topology.
- 1931 Marston Morse (Harvard University): The calculus of variations in the large.
- 1932 Joseph Ritt (Columbia University): Differential equations from the algebraic standpoint.
- 1934 Raymond Paley (Trinity College, Cambridge University), deceased in 1933 and replaced by Norbert Wiener (Massachusetts Institute of Technology): Fourier transforms in the complex domain.
- 1935 Harry Vandiver (University of Texas): Fermat's last theorem and related topics in number theory.
- 1936 Edward W. Chittenden (University of Iowa): Topics in general analysis.
- 1937 John von Neumann (Institute for Advanced Study): Continuous geometry.
- 1939 Abraham Adrian Albert (University of Chicago): Structure of algebras.
- 1939 Marshall Stone (Harvard University): Convex bodies.
- 1940 Gordon Thomas Whyburn (University of Virginia): Analytic topology.
- 1941 Øystein Ore (Yale University): Mathematical relations and structures.
- 1942 Raymond Louis Wilder (University of Michigan): Topology of manifolds.
- 1943 Edward James McShane (University of Virginia): Existence theorems in the calculus of variations.
- 1944 Einar Hille (Yale University): Selected topics in the theory of semi-groups.
- 1945 Tibor Radó (Ohio State University): Length and area.
- 1946 Hassler Whitney (Harvard University): Topology of smooth manifolds.
- 1947 Oscar Zariski (Harvard University): Abstract algebraic geometry.
- 1948 Richard Brauer (University of Toronto): Representation of groups and rings.
- 1949 Gustav Hedlund (Yale University): Topological Dynamics.
- 1951 Deane Montgomery (Institute for Advanced Study): Topological transformation groups.
- 1952 Alfred Tarski (University of California, Berkeley): Arithmetical classes and types of algebraic systems.
- 1953 Antoni Zygmund (University of Chicago): On the existence and properties of certain singular integrals.
- 1955 Nathan Jacobson (Yale University): Jordan algebras.
- 1956 Salomon Bochner (Princeton University): Harmonic analysis and probability.
- 1957 Norman Steenrod (Princeton University): Cohomology operations.
- 1959 Joseph L. Doob (University of Illinois, Urbana-Champaign): The first boundary value problem.
- 1960 Shiing-Shen Chern (University of California, Berkeley): Geometrical structures on manifolds.
- 1961 George Mackey (Harvard University): Infinite dimensional group representatives.
- 1963 Saunders Mac Lane (University of Chicago): Categorical algebra.
- 1964 Charles Morrey (University of California, Berkeley): Multiple integrals in the calculus of variations.
- 1965 Alberto Calderón (University of Chicago): Singular integrals.
- 1967 Samuel Eilenberg (Columbia University): Universal algebras and the theory of automata.
- 1968 Donald Spencer (Stanford University): Overdetermined systems of partial differential equations.
- 1968 John Willard Milnor (Princeton University and University of California, Los Angeles): Uses of the fundamental group.
- 1969 Raoul Bott (Harvard University): On the periodicity theorem of the classical groups and its applications.
- 1969 Harish-Chandra (Institute for Advanced Study): Harmonic analysis of semisimple Lie groups.
- 1970 R. H. Bing (University of Wisconsin, Madison): Topology of 3-manifolds.
- 1971 Lipman Bers (Columbia University): Uniformization, moduli, and Kleinian groups.
- 1971 Armand Borel (Institute for Advanced Study): Algebraic groups and arithmetic groups.
- 1972 Stephen Smale (University of California, Berkeley): Applications of global analysis to biology, economics, electrical circuits, and celestial mechanics.
- 1972 John T. Tate (Harvard University): The arithmetic of elliptic curves.
- 1973 Michael Francis Atiyah (Institute for Advanced Study): The index of elliptic operators.
- 1973 Felix Browder (University of Chicago): Nonlinear functional analysis and its applications to nonlinear partial differential and integral equations.
- 1974 Errett Bishop (University of California, San Diego): Schizophrenia in contemporary mathematics.
- 1974 Louis Nirenberg (Courant Institute): Selected topics in partial differential equations.
- 1974 John Griggs Thompson (University of Cambridge): Finite simple groups.
- 1975 Howard Jerome Keisler (University of Wisconsin): New directions in model theory.
- 1975 Ellis Kolchin (Columbia University): Differential algebraic groups.
- 1975 Elias Stein (Princeton University): Singular integrals, old and new.
- 1976 Isadore M. Singer (Massachusetts Institute of Technology): Connections between analysis, geometry and topology.
- 1976 Jürgen Moser (Courant Institute): Recent progress in dynamical systems.
- 1977 William Browder (Princeton University): Differential topology of higher dimensional manifolds.
- 1977 Herbert Federer (Brown University): Geometric measure theory.
- 1978 Hyman Bass (Columbia University): Algebraic K-theory.
- 1979 Phillip Griffiths (Harvard University): Complex analysis and algebraic geometry.
- 1979 George Mostow (Yale University): Discrete subgroups of Lie groups.
- 1980 Wolfgang M. Schmidt (University of Colorado, Boulder): Various methods in number theory.
- 1980 Julia Robinson (University of California, Berkeley): Between logic and arithmetic.
- 1981 Mark Kac (Rockefeller University): Some mathematical problems suggested by questions in physics.
- 1981 Serge Lang (Yale University): Units and class numbers in algebraic geometry and number theory.
- 1982 Dennis Sullivan (CUNY, Graduate School and University Center): Geometry, iteration, and group theory.
- 1982 Morris Hirsch (University of California, Berkeley): Convergence in ordinary and partial differential equations.
- 1983 Charles Fefferman (Princeton University): The uncertainty principle.
- 1983 Bertram Kostant (Massachusetts Institute of Technology): On the Coxeter element and the structure of the exceptional Lie groups.
- 1984 Barry Mazur (Harvard University): On the arithmetic of curves.
- 1984 Paul Rabinowitz (University of Wisconsin, Madison): Minimax methods in critical point theory and applications to differential equations.
- 1985 Daniel Gorenstein (Rutgers University): The classification of the finite simple groups.
- 1985 Karen Uhlenbeck (University of Chicago): Mathematical gauge field theory.
- 1986 Shing-Tung Yau (University of California, San Diego): Nonlinear analysis.
- 1987 Peter Lax (Courant Institute): Uses of the non-Euclidean wave equation.
- 1987 Edward Witten (Princeton University): Mathematical applications of quantum field theory.
- 1988 Victor Guillemin (Massachusetts Institute of Technology): Spectral properties of Riemannian manifolds.
- 1989 Nicholas Katz (Princeton University): Exponential sums and differential equations.
- 1989 William Thurston (Princeton University): Geometry, groups, and self-similar tilings.
- 1990 Shlomo Sternberg (Harvard University): Some thoughts on the interaction between group theory and physics.
- 1991 Robert MacPherson (Massachusetts Institute of Technology): Intersection homology and perverse sheaves.
- 1992 Robert Langlands (Institute for Advanced Study): Automorphic forms and Hasse-Wiel zeta-functions and Finite models for percolation.
- 1993 Luis Caffarelli (Institute for Advanced Study): Nonlinear differential equations and Lagrangian coordinates.
- 1993 Sergiu Klainerman (Princeton University): On the regularity properties of gauge theories in Minkowski space-time.
- 1994 Jean Bourgain (IHES and the University of Illinois, Urbana-Champaign): Harmonic analysis and nonlinear evolution equations.
- 1995 Clifford Taubes (Harvard University): Mysteries in three and four dimensions.
- 1996 Andrew Wiles (Princeton University): Modular forms, elliptic curves and Galois representations.
- 1997 Daniel Stroock (Massachusetts Institute of Technology): Analysis on spaces of paths.
- 1998 Gian-Carlo Rota (Massachusetts Institute of Technology): Introduction to geometric probability; Invariant theory old and new; and Combinatorial snapshots.
- 1999 Helmut Hofer (Courant Institute, New York University): Symplectic geometry from a dynamical systems point of view.
- 2000 Curtis McMullen (Harvard University): Riemann surfaces in dynamics, topology, and arithmetic.
- 2001 János Kollár (Princeton University): Large rationally connected varieties.
- 2002 Lawrence C. Evans (University of California, Berkeley): Entropy methods for partial differential equations.
- 2003 Peter Sarnak (Courant Institute and Princeton University): Spectra of hyperbolic surfaces and applications.
- 2004 Sun-Yung Alice Chang (Princeton University): Conformal invariants and partial differential equations.
- 2005 Robert Lazarsfeld (University of Michigan): How polynomials vanish: Singularities, integrals, and ideals.
- 2006 Hendrik Lenstra (Universiteit Leiden): Entangled radicals.
- 2007 Andrei Okounkov (Princeton University): Limit shapes, real and imagined.
- 2008 Wendelin Werner (University of Paris-Sud): Random conformally invariant pictures.
- 2009 Grigori Alexandrowitsch Margulis (Yale University): Homogenous dynamics and number theory.
- 2010 Richard P. Stanley (Massachusetts Institute of Technology): Permutations: 1) Increasing and decreasing subsequences; 2) Alternating permutations; 3) Reduced decompositions.
- 2011 Alexander Lubotzky (The Hebrew University of Jerusalem): Expander graphs in pure and applied mathematics.
- 2012 Edward Frenkel (University of California, Berkeley): Langlands program, trace formulas, and their geometrization.
- 2013 Alice Guionnet (Ecole Normale Supérieure de Lyon): Free probability and random matrices.
- 2014 Dusa McDuff (Columbia University): Symplectic topology today.
- 2015 Michael J. Hopkins (Harvard University): 1) Algebraic topology: New and old directions; 2) The Kervaire invariant problem; 3) Chern-Weil theory and abstract homotopy theory.
- 2016 Timothy A. Gowers (University of Cambridge): Generalizations of Fourier analysis, and how to apply them.
- 2017 Carlos Kenig (University of Chicago): The focusing energy critical wave equation: the radical case in 3 space dimensions.
- 2018 Avi Wigderson (Institute for Advanced Study): 1) Alternate Minimization and Scaling algorithms: theory, applications and connections across mathematics and computer science; 2) Proving algebraic identities; 3) Proving analytic inequalities.
- 2019 Benedict Gross (Harvard University): Complex multiplication: past, present, future.
- 2020 Ingrid Daubechies (Duke University): Mathematical Frameworks for Signal and Image Analysis.
- 2021 not awarded
- 2022 Karen E. Smith (University of Michigan): Understanding and measuring singularities in algebraic geometry.
- 2023 Camillo De Lellis (Princeton University): Flows of nonsmooth vector fields.

== See also ==
- Josiah Willard Gibbs Lectureship
