= Archives of American Mathematics =

Coordinates: 30.285333°N 97.728802°W

The Archives of American Mathematics, located at the University of Texas at Austin, aims to collect, preserve, and provide access to the papers principally of American mathematicians and the records of American mathematical organizations.

== History ==
The Archives began in 1975 at the University of Texas at Austin with the preservation of the papers of Texas mathematicians R.L. Moore and H.S. Vandiver.

In 1978, the Mathematical Association of America established the university as the official repository for its archival records and the name "Archives of American Mathematics" was adopted to encompass all of the mathematical archival collections at the university. Originally a part of the Harry Ransom Center, in 1984, the Archives was added to the special collections of the Briscoe Center for American History at the University of Texas at Austin.

== Collections ==
The AAM includes approximately 120 collections.

=== Notable examples ===
- Mathematical Association of America Records.
- Thomas F. Banchoff Papers document a career of teaching, writing, and making mathematical films.
- Marion Walter Photograph Collection includes photographs of A.A. Albert, H.S.M. Coxeter, Paul Erdős, Fritz John, D.H. Lehmer, Alexander Ostrowski, George Polya, Mina Rees, and Olga Taussky-Todd.
- School Mathematics Study Group Records document the history of the "New Math" movement of the 1960s, and includes the files of the director, Edward G. Begle.
- Dorothy L. Bernstein Papers reflect both her professional and personal life.
- Paul R. Halmos Photograph Collection consists of 14,000 photographs Halmos and others took from the 1930s to 2006.
- Ivor Grattan-Guinness Papers reflect the career of a mathematics historian.
- Paul Erdős and Carl Pomerance Correspondence Collection consists of 435 letters between Erdős and Pomerance.

=== Other holdings ===
- Agnew (Jeanne) Papers
- Air Force Operations Analysis Section
- Anderson (Bruce A.) Papers
- Ball (B. J.) Papers
- Beberman (Max) Film Collection
- Biedenharn (Lawrence) Papers
- Bing (R. H.) Papers
- Bruck (R. H.) Papers
- Cheney (E. W.) Papers
- Cleveland (Clark M) Papers
- Conference on Orthogonal Expansions and their Continuous Analogues
- Cooper (Albert Everett) Papers
- Dehn (Max) Papers
- DeWitt (Bryce S.) Papers
- Dijkstra (Edsger W.) Papers
- Dodd (Edward L.) Papers
- Duke Mathematical Journal Records
- Eberlein (W. F.) Papers
- Ettlinger (H. J.) Papers
- Ettlinger (H. J.) Photographs
- Feit (Walter) Papers
- Fuller (Frederick Lincoln) Papers
- Greenwood (R. E.) Papers
- Griffin (John S., Jr.) Papers
- Grosswald (Emil) Papers
- Halsted (George Bruce) Papers
- Hedrick (E. R.) Collection
- Helly (Eduard) Papers
- Henderson (David) Papers
- Henriksen (Melvin) Oral History Collection
- Houston Topology Seminar Records
- Johnson (Gordon) Papers
- Jones (F. Burton) Papers
- Jones (Phillip S.) Papers
- Lane (Ralph E.) Papers
- Linear Algebra and its Applications Records
- Lubben (R. G.) Papers
- Mac Lane (Saunders) Papers
- Macfarlane (Alexander) Collection
- Mathematics of Computation Unpublished Math Tables Collection
- Mechanical Harmonic Synthesizer/Multiharmonograph Collection
- Miksa (Francis L.) Papers
- Moore (R. L.) Legacy Collection
- Moore (R. L.) Papers
- Morrey (Charles Bradfield) Papers
- National Council of Teachers of Mathematics Oral History Project Records
- National Research Council Collection
- Neuberger (J. W.) Papers
- New Mathematical Library Records
- Nikodym (Otton Martin) Papers
- Pettis (B. J.) Papers
- Porter (Gerald J.) Mathematical Publications Collection
- Price (G. Baley) Papers
- Princeton Mathematics Community in the 1930s Oral History Collection
- Rainich (George Yuri) Papers
- Reid (William T.) Papers
- Robinson (Abraham) Papers
- Rosser (J. Barkley) Papers
- Schild (Alfred) Papers
- Schoenberg (I. J.) Papers
- Schoenfeld (Lowell) Papers
- Seever (Galen L.) Papers
- Silverman (Louis Lazarus) Papers
- Steenrod (Norman Earl) Papers
- Stiles (F. A.) Papers
- Truesdell (C.) Papers
- Tucker (Albert William) Papers
- Van Heijenoort (Jean) Papers
- Vandiver (H. S.) Papers
- Von Neumann (John) Papers
- Wall (H. S.) Papers
- Whyburn (Gordon Thomas) Papers
- Whyburn (William M.) Papers
- Wilder (Raymond Louis) Papers
- William Lowell Putnam Mathematical Competition Records
- Young (David M.) Papers

== Related collections elsewhere ==
Significant archives of American mathematicians and their organizations are held by other repositories. The following are examples which include a few Canadian collections with substantial United States connections. For the complete holdings, the catalogs of the individual repositories would need to be consulted. In addition, the archives of academic institutions will typically include administrative records of mathematics departments and clubs as well as the papers of faculty.

- John Hay Library, Brown University -- American Mathematical Society Records (1888- ); Raymond Clare Archibald (1875–1957); James Glaisher (1848–1928); R. G. D. Richardson (1878–1949); Marshall Harvey Stone (1903–1989); James Joseph Sylvester (1814–1897) also at St. John's College (Cambridge).
- American Philosophical Society -- Robert Patterson (1743–1824); David Rittenhouse (1732–1796); Robert Adrain (1775–1843); Samuel Stanley Wilks (1906–1964).
- Amherst College—Ebenezer Strong Snell (1801–1876).
- Boston Public Library -- Nathaniel Bowditch (1773–1838); Nicholas Pike (1743–1819).
- Bridgewater State University—L.S. Dederich (1883–1972).
- College of Charleston Library—Lewis Reeve Gibbes (1810–1894), also Library of Congress;
- Columbia University -- Arthur Korn (1870–1945); Cassius Jackson Keyser (1862–1947); Christine Franklin (1847–1930) and Fabian Franklin (1853–1939); F. A. P. Barnard (1809–1889); Harold Hotelling (1895-); Henry Seely White (1861–1943); John Howard Van Amringe (1835–1915); Thomas Scott Fiske (1865–1944); David Eugene Smith (1860–1944).
- Dartmouth College -- George Robert Stibitz (1904–1995).
- Duke University—Edward Henry Courtenay (1803–1853).
- Hampshire College—Herman Goldstine (1913–2004).
- Harvard University -- Benjamin Peirce (1809–1880); Charles Sanders Peirce (1839–1914); Damodar Dharmanand Kosambi (1907–1966); Isaac Greenwood (1702–1745); John Farrar (1779–1853); John Winthrop (1714–1779); Maxime Bôcher (1867–1918); Richard Von Mises (1883–1953); Thomas Hill (1818–1891); George David Birkhoff (1884–1944).
- Iowa State University -- American Statistical Association (1839-); Herbert Solomon (1919–2004); Edward J. Wegman (1943-); Eugene Lukacs (1906–1987); Ingram Olkin (1924-).
- Hope College—Albert Eugene Lampen (1887–1963); Jay Erenst Folkert (1916-).
- Library of Congress -- Andrew Ellicott (1754–1820); George F. Becker (1847–1919); Oswald Veblen (1880–1960); Lewis Reeve Gibbes (1810–1894); John von Neumann (1903–1957), also College of Charleston; Gloria Ford Gilmer (1928–2021).
- Maryland Historical Society -- John Henry Alexander (1812–1867).
- McMaster University (Canada) -- Bertrand Russell (1872–1970).
- Massachusetts Institute of Technology -- John Daniel Runkle (1822–1902); Norbert Wiener (1894–1964).
- National Research Council (Canada) -- Julius Plücker (1801–1868).
- New Jersey Historical Society -- Francis Robbins Upton (1852–1921).
- New York Public Library -- Ferdinand Rudolph Hassler (1770–1843).
- New York University -- Richard Courant (1888–1972).
- Northwestern University -- Ernst D. Hellinger (1883–1950); Helen M. Clark (1908–1974); Lois W. Griffiths (1899–1981); Thomas Franklin Holgate (1859–1945).
- Northwestern State University -- Guy Waldo Dunnington (1906–1974)
- Ohio History Connection -- Jared Mansfield (1759–1830), also U.S. Military Academy.
- Princeton University -- Alfred James Lotka (1880–1949); Walter Minto (1753–1796); Eugene Paul Wigner (1902–1995); Henry Dallas Thompson (1864–1927); Kurt Gödel (1906–1978); Nicola Fergola (1757–1824); Sylvester Robins (files: 1880–1899).
- Rice University—Fred Terry Rogers (1914–1956); Salomon Bochner (1899–1982).
- Rockefeller Archive Center -- Mark Kac (1914–1984).
- Rutgers University—Edward Albert Bowser (1837–1910); George Washington Coakley (1814–1893).
- Smith College, Sophia Smith Collection -- Dorothy Maud Wrinch (1895–1976).
- Stanford University -- Georg Pólya (1887–1985).
- University of Chicago -- A. Adrian Albert (1905-1972 ); Saunders Mac Lane (1909–2005); E. H. Moore (1862–1932); Alfred L. Putnam (1916–2004); Nicolas Rashevsky (1899–1972); Ernest Julius Wilczynski (1876–1932).
- University of Illinois at Urbana-Champaign -- Arnold Emch (1871–1959); Arthur Byron Coble (1878–1966); George Abram Miller (1863–1951); George William Meyers (1864–1931); Leonard L. Steimley (1890–1975); Olive C. Hazlett (1890–1974); Robert Daniel Carmichael (1879–1967).
- University of Michigan—Wooster Woodruff Beman (1850–1922); Louis Allen Hopkins (1881-).
- State Historical Society of Missouri—Joseph Ficklin (1833–1887).
- University of North Carolina; U. of Texas -- Charles Scott Venable (1827–1900).
- University of Oklahoma Library -- Nathan Altshiller Court (1881–1968).
- University of Toronto -- Kenneth O. May (1915–1977).
- University of Virginia -- G. T. Whyburn (1904–1969)
- University of Washington Libraries -- Carl B. Allendoerfer (1911–1974).
- University of Wisconsin -- Albert C. Schaeffer (files: 1954–1956); Bronson Barlow (Mathematics of Design) (b. 1924); Charles S. Slichter (files: 1891–1941); Cyrus C. MacDuffee (1895–1961); Edward Burr Van Vleck (1863–1943); Ernest B. Skinner (files: 1892–1935); Isaac Schoenberg (files: 1930–1980); Ivan Sokolnikoff (1901-); J. Barkley Rosser (1907–1989); John D. Mayor (?); Mark H. Ingraham (1896–1982); Military Training Programs, WW II (1943–1945); U.S. Naval Research Office (1951–1955); Rudolph E. Langer (1894–1968); Stephen Kleene (1909–1994); Warren Weaver (1894–1978).
- Virginia Military Institute -- Claudius Crozet (1789–1864).
- Virginia Polytechnic Institute And State University -- Irving John Good (1916–2009); John Edward Williams (1867–1943).
- Wake Forest University—John Wesley Sawyer (1916-); Roland L. Gay (1905–1979)
- Western Reserve Historical Society (Cleveland) -- Elisha Scott Loomis (1852–1940).
- Yale University Library -- Abraham Robinson (1918–1974); Elias Loomis (1811–1889); Josiah Willard Gibbs (1839–1903).
- Yeshiva University -- Jekuthiel Ginsburg (1889–1957)
