= Josiah Willard Gibbs Lectureship =

American mathematics award

The Josiah Willard Gibbs Lectureship (also called the Gibbs Lecture) of the American Mathematical Society is an annually awarded mathematical prize, named in honor of Josiah Willard Gibbs. The prize is intended not only for mathematicians, but also for physicists, chemists, biologists, physicians, and other scientists who have made important applications of mathematics. The purpose of the prize is to recognize outstanding achievement in applied mathematics and "to enable the public and the academic community to become aware of the contribution that mathematics is making to present-day thinking and to modern civilization."

The prize winner gives a lecture, which is subsequently published in the Bulletin of the American Mathematical Society.

== Prize winners ==
- 1923 Mihajlo Pupin
- 1924 Robert Henderson
- 1925 James Pierpont
- 1926 Horatio Burt Williams
- 1927 Ernest William Brown
- 1928 Godfrey Harold Hardy
- 1929 Irving Fisher
- 1930 Edgar Bright Wilson
- 1931 Percy Williams Bridgman
- 1932 Richard C. Tolman
- 1934 Albert Einstein
- 1935 Vannevar Bush
- 1936 Henry Norris Russell
- 1937 Charles August Kraus
- 1939 Theodore von Kármán
- 1941 Sewall Wright
- 1943 Harry Bateman
- 1944 John von Neumann
- 1945 John C. Slater
- 1946 Subrahmanyan Chandrasekhar
- 1947 Philip M. Morse
- 1948 Hermann Weyl
- 1949 Norbert Wiener
- 1950 George Eugene Uhlenbeck
- 1951 Kurt Gödel
- 1952 Harold Calvin Marston Morse
- 1953 Wassily Leontief
- 1954 Kurt Friedrichs
- 1955 Joseph Edward Mayer
- 1956 Marshall Harvey Stone
- 1958 Hermann Joseph Muller
- 1959 Johannes Martinus Burgers
- 1960 Julian Seymour Schwinger
- 1961 James J. Stoker
- 1962 Chen Ning Yang
- 1963 Claude Elwood Shannon
- 1964 Lars Onsager
- 1965 Derrick Henry Lehmer
- 1966 Martin Schwarzschild
- 1967 Mark Kac
- 1968 Eugene Paul Wigner
- 1969 Raymond Louis Wilder
- 1970 Walter Munk
- 1971 Eberhard Hopf
- 1972 Freeman Dyson
- 1973 Jürgen Moser
- 1974 Paul A. Samuelson
- 1975 Fritz John
- 1976 Arthur Wightman
- 1977 Joseph B. Keller
- 1978 Donald Ervin Knuth
- 1979 Martin Kruskal
- 1980 Kenneth G. Wilson
- 1981 Cathleen Synge Morawetz
- 1982 Elliott Montroll
- 1983 Samuel Karlin
- 1984 Herbert A. Simon
- 1985 Michael O. Rabin
- 1986 Laurence Edward Scriven
- 1987 Thomas C. Spencer
- 1988 David Ruelle
- 1989 Elliott Lieb
- 1990 George Dantzig
- 1991 Michael Francis Atiyah
- 1992 Michael E. Fisher
- 1993 Charles S. Peskin
- 1994 Robert May
- 1995 Andrew Majda
- 1996 Steven Weinberg
- 1997 Persi Diaconis
- 1998 Edward Witten
- 1999 Nancy Kopell
- 2000 Roger Penrose
- 2001 Ronald Graham
- 2002 Michael Berry
- 2003 David Bryant Mumford
- 2004 Eric Lander
- 2005 Ingrid Daubechies
- 2006 Michael Savageau
- 2007 Peter Lax
- 2008 Avi Wigderson
- 2009 Percy Deift
- 2010 Peter Shor
- 2011 George C. Papanicolaou
- 2012 Bradley Efron
- 2013 Cédric Villani
- 2014 Andrew Blake
- 2015 Ronald Graham
- 2016 Daniel A. Spielman
- 2017 John Preskill
- 2018 Cynthia Dwork
- 2019 Alan Perelson
- 2020 Nancy Reid
- 2021 Lenka Zdeborová
- 2022 Eitan Tadmor
- 2023 Richard Baraniuk
- 2024 Suzanne Lenhart
- 2025 Yann LeCun

== See also ==
- Colloquium Lectures (AMS)
- List of mathematics awards
