= Alexander Doniphan Wallace =

American mathematician

Alexander Doniphan Wallace (21 August 1905, in Hampton, Virginia, USA – 16 October 1985, in New Orleans, USA) was an American mathematician who introduced proximity spaces.

Wallace received from the University of Virginia B.A. in 1935, M.A. in 1936 and Ph.D. in 1940. He was an instructor at Princeton University in 1940–1941 and became an assistant professor in mathematics at the University of Pennsylvania in 1941 and remained there until 1947. He was a professor and chair of the mathematics department at Tulane University in 1947–1963. From 1963 until his retirement in 1973 he was a mathematics professor at the University of Florida.

His doctoral students include Chung Tao Yang.

== Selected articles ==
- Wallace, A. D. (1961). "A theorem on acyclicity". Bulletin of the American Mathematical Society. 67: 123–124. doi:10.1090/s0002-9904-1961-10534-x. MR 0124886.
- Wallace, A. D. (1960). "Remarks on affine semigroups". Bulletin of the American Mathematical Society. 66 (2): 110–112. doi:10.1090/s0002-9904-1960-10419-3. MR 0110768.
- Wallace, Alexander Doniphan (1958). "Factoring a lattice". Proceedings of the American Mathematical Society. 9 (2): 250–252. doi:10.1090/s0002-9939-1958-0094306-1. MR 0094306.
- Koch, Robert J.; Wallace, A. D. (1958). "Admissibility of semigroup structures on continua". Transactions of the American Mathematical Society. 88 (2): 277–287. doi:10.1090/s0002-9947-1958-0095223-8. MR 0095223.
- Wallace, A. D. (1957). "The peripheral character of central elements of a lattice". Proceedings of the American Mathematical Society. 8 (3): 596–597. doi:10.1090/s0002-9939-1957-0087882-5. MR 0087882.
- Wallace, A. D. (1955). "The structure of topological semigroups". Bulletin of the American Mathematical Society. 61 (2): 95–112. doi:10.1090/s0002-9904-1955-09895-1. MR 0067907.
- Wallace, A. D. (1955). "The position of $C$-sets in semigroups". Proceedings of the American Mathematical Society. 6 (4): 639–642. doi:10.1090/s0002-9939-1955-0071709-x. MR 0071709.
- Wallace, A. D. (1955). "Struct ideals". Proceedings of the American Mathematical Society. 6 (4): 634–638. doi:10.1090/s0002-9939-1955-0071756-8. MR 0071756.
- Wallace, A. D. (1954). "Topological invariance of ideals in mobs". Proceedings of the American Mathematical Society. 5 (6): 866–868. doi:10.1090/s0002-9939-1954-0066399-5. MR 0066399.
- Wallace, A. D. (1954). "Partial order and indecomposability". Proceedings of the American Mathematical Society. 5 (5): 780–781. doi:10.1090/s0002-9939-1954-0064391-8. MR 0064391.
- Wallace, A. D. (1953). "Boolean rings and cohomology". Proceedings of the American Mathematical Society. 4 (3): 475. doi:10.1090/s0002-9939-1953-0055668-x. MR 0055668.
- Wallace, A. D. (1951). "Extensional invariance". Transactions of the American Mathematical Society. 70: 97–102. doi:10.1090/s0002-9947-1951-0041421-2. MR 0041421.
- Wallace, A. D. (1949). "Cyclic invariance under multi-valued maps". Bulletin of the American Mathematical Society. 55 (8): 820–824. doi:10.1090/s0002-9904-1949-09299-6. MR 0033534.
- Wallace, A. D. (1946). "Extension sets". Transactions of the American Mathematical Society. 59: 1–13. doi:10.1090/s0002-9947-1946-0014809-1. MR 0014809.
- Wallace, A. D. (1945). "Dimensional types". Bulletin of the American Mathematical Society. 51 (10): 679–681. doi:10.1090/s0002-9904-1945-08416-x. MR 0013302.
- Wallace, A. D. (1945). "A fixed-point theorem". Bulletin of the American Mathematical Society. 51, Part 1 (6): 413–416. doi:10.1090/s0002-9904-1945-08367-0. MR 0012221.
- Wallace, A. D. (1941). "The acyclic elements of a Peano space". Bulletin of the American Mathematical Society. 47 (10): 778–780. doi:10.1090/s0002-9904-1941-07568-3. MR 0004757.
- Wallace, A. D. (1941). "A fixed-point theorem for trees". Bulletin of the American Mathematical Society. 47 (10): 757–760. doi:10.1090/s0002-9904-1941-07556-7. MR 0004758.
- Wallace, A. D. (1939). "On non-boundary sets". Bulletin of the American Mathematical Society. 45 (6): 420–422. doi:10.1090/s0002-9904-1939-06997-8. MR 1563997.
- Hall, Dick W.; Wallace, Alexander D. (1939). "Some invariants under monotone transformations". Bulletin of the American Mathematical Society. 45 (4): 294–295. doi:10.1090/s0002-9904-1939-06964-4. MR 1563969.
