= Horatio Burt Williams =

American electrophysiologist (1877 to 1955)

Horatio Burt Williams (September 17, 1877 to November 1, 1955) was an American clinical electrophysiologist.

== Life ==
Williams was born on September 17, 1877, in Utica, New York.

For college studies Williams chose physics. He went to Syracuse University to study medicine, graduating as medical doctor in 1905. As an assistant in physiology at Cornell Medical School, he began his work in electrophysiology. He published an article on electrocardiograms. Williams traveled to Holland to study the methods of Willem Einthoven in 1911.

He constructed the first string galvanometer in America, pioneered vectorcardiography, discovered the ventricular vulnerable period, and first determined the 60-Hz current required to produce ventricular fibrillation with body-surface electrodes.

Williams also showed that ventricular defibrillation could be achieved with body-surface electrodes using high-intensity 60-Hz current.

In 1926 he was selected for the Josiah Willard Gibbs Lectureship by the American Mathematical Society. The lecture was published by the National Research Council as Mathematics and the Biological Sciences. The text was also published in the Bulletin of the American Mathematical Society. Williams expressed the hope, "So soon as it becomes possible to construct biological theories in mathematical form we may expect rapid progress."(page 293)

Williams died at the age of 78 on November 1, 1955, at the Presbyterian Hospital in New York.
