= Robert Henderson (mathematician) =

Canadian-American mathematician and actuary

Robert Henderson (24 May 1871, Russell, Ontario – 16 February 1942, Crown Point, New York) was a Canadian-American mathematician and actuary.

== Education and career ==
Robert Henderson matriculated at age 16 at the University of Toronto and graduated there in 1891 with a bachelor's degree in mathematics. He spent a year as a fellow of the University of Toronto and then in 1892 was employed at the Government Insurance Department in Ottawa until he left Canada in 1897. From 1897 until his retirement in 1936 he worked for the Equitable Life Assurance Society of the United States. There he was from 1903 to 1911 an assistant actuary, from 1911 to 1920 an actuary, from 1920 to 1929 the second vice-president, and from 1929 to 1936 the vice-president.

Henderson worked in the field of actuarial science, including life insurance and its history, mortality tables, interpolation, cumulative frequency analysis, and moments. In 1914 he was a member of the Committee of the Census appointed by the Actuarial Society of America to advise the Director of the United States Census Bureau. In 1915 he performed the actuarial work for the establishment of the Church Pension Fund for the Episcopal Church.

In August 1924 he was an Invited Speaker of the ICM in Toronto. On 30 December 1924 he gave the Gibbs Lecture. In 1930 he received an honorary doctorate from the University of Toronto.

Henderson served a two-year term as president of the Actuarial Society of America. In 1910, he became a member of the American Mathematical Society (AMS). He was elected to the American Philosophical Society in 1927. He was a member of the AMS Board of Trustees from 1924 to 1928 and then from 1931 to 1940.

== Robert Henderson Fund ==
On 31 December 1940, upon his retirement from the Board of Trustees of the American Mathematical Society (AMS), he gave 1,000 U.S. dollars to the AMS, which the Trustees set aside as the Robert Henderson Fund. His will bequeathed to the AMS and two beneficiaries (co-heirs), the income from his estate, approximately 4000 U.S. dollars annually. After the death of his last surviving co-heir in 1961, the AMS received all of the capital for its Robert Henderson Fund.

== Selected publications ==
- Actuarial society examinations in 1905. Questions and solutions reprinted from recent issues of the American underwriter and The fundamental principles of probability. New York City: Thrift Publishing Company. 1906.
- Henderson, Robert (1907). "Frequency-Curves and Moments". Journal of the Institute of Actuaries. 41 (3): 429–442. doi:10.1017/s0020268100024318. JSTOR 41136478. reprinted from the Transactions of the Actuarial Society of America, vol. 8, p. 30
- Mortality Laws and Statistics. Mathematical Monograph, vol. 15. New York: J. Wiley. 1915.
- with Herbert Norman Sheppard: Graduation of Mortality and Other Tables. Actuarial studies, vol. 4. New York: The Actuarial Society of America. 1919.
- Henderson, R. (1923). "Geodesic lines in Riemann space". Annals of Mathematics. 24 (4): 355–358. doi:10.2307/1967679. JSTOR 1967679.
- Mathematical Theory of Graduation. New York: The Actuarial society of America. 1938.
