= Lois Wilfred Griffiths =

American mathematician

- Born: June 27, 1899; Chagrin Falls, Ohio, US
- Died: November 9, 1981 (aged 82); Skokie, Illinois, US
- Education: University of Washington; University of Chicago
- Known for: Study of polygonal numbers
- Scientific career
- Fields: Polygonal Numbers
- Workplaces: Northwestern University
- Thesis: Certain quaternary quadratic forms and diophantine equations by generalized quaternion algebras (1927)
- Doctoral advisor: Leonard Dickson

Lois Wilfred Griffiths (June 27, 1899 – November 9, 1981) was an American mathematician and teacher. She served as a researcher, mathematician, and professor for 37 years at Northwestern University before retiring in 1964. She is best known for her work in polygonal numbers. She published multiple papers and wrote a textbook, Introduction to the Theory of Equations, published in 1945.

== Early life and education ==
=== Early life ===
Lois Wilfred Griffiths was born on June 27, 1899, to Frederick William Griffiths, a minister, and Lena Jones Griffiths, a schoolteacher, in Chagrin Falls, Ohio. Frederick Griffiths had emigrated to the United States in 1880 from Wales. In the United States, he earned a Bachelor of Arts from Oberlin College in 1893 and a Bachelor of Divinity from Oberlin Theological Seminary in 1896. Lena Jones Griffiths was born in the United States and studied at Kansas State Normal School. In 1898, they moved to Ohio where Lena gave birth to Harold F. Griffiths in 1898 and Lois in 1899. They moved again in 1899 to Jennings, Oklahoma Territory, before finally settling in Seattle in 1904.

=== Education ===
Griffiths attended public schools in Washington state, then attended the University of Washington. She served as an assistant to the Comptroller of the university during her undergraduate course. In 1921, she graduated with a bachelor's degree. In 1923 she earned a master's degree, also from the University of Washington, after writing Contact Curves of the Rational Cubic. The paper was published in typewritten arrangement by the University. She was elected as a member of the American Mathematical Society in September 1923, following which her master's thesis was published in the Bulletin of the American Mathematical Society.

In October 1925, she enrolled at the University of Chicago to pursue a doctorate in mathematics. She was supervised for the Ph.D course by well-known mathematician Leonard Dickson. Her thesis Certain quaternary quadratic forms and diophantine equations by generalized quaternion algebras earned her a doctorate degree in 1927.

== Career ==
In 1927, after earning her doctorate, she was engaged as an instructor of mathematics at Northwestern University in Evanston, Illinois, where she spent the remainder of her career. In 1930, she was promoted to assistant professor of mathematics, and in 1938 she was named associate professor. She retired from Northwestern University in 1964 and was named professor emeritus.

During her professional career she published many mathematics papers such as "Generalized Quaternion Algebras and the Theory of Numbers" and "Representation of Integers in the Form x^{2} + 2y^{2} + 3z^{2} + 6w^{2}", both in the American Journal of Mathematics. She also published "A generalization of the Fermat theorem on polygonal numbers" in the Annals of Mathematics, "Representation by Extended Polygonal Numbers and by Generalized Polygonal Numbers" and "Representation as Sums of Multiples of Generalized Polygonal Numbers".

Griffiths also wrote reviews of mathematical texts such as Introduction to the Theory of Groups of Finite Order (1939) by Robert Daniel Carmichael, An Introduction to Abstract Algebra (1941) by Cyrus Colton MacDuffee, and A Survey of Modern Algebra (1942) by Garrett Birkhoff and Saunders Mac Lane. She also published notes on functions of polygonal numbers.

She wrote a book on determinants and systems of linear equations, published as the textbook Introduction to the Theory of Equations by John Wiley and Sons in 1945.

Following the book publication she wrote two additional papers, Outline of the theory of groups (1948) and Matrices and linear dependence (1949), which were never published.

== Personal life and death ==
Her mother Lena lived with her in Evanston from 1945 until her mother's death in 1956. Lois Griffiths died on November 9, 1981, in Skokie, Illinois.

== Recognition ==
Griffiths was honored in 1954 with life membership of the Northwestern University Alumni Association.
