= Eberhard Voit =

American biologist (born 1953)

Eberhard O. Voit
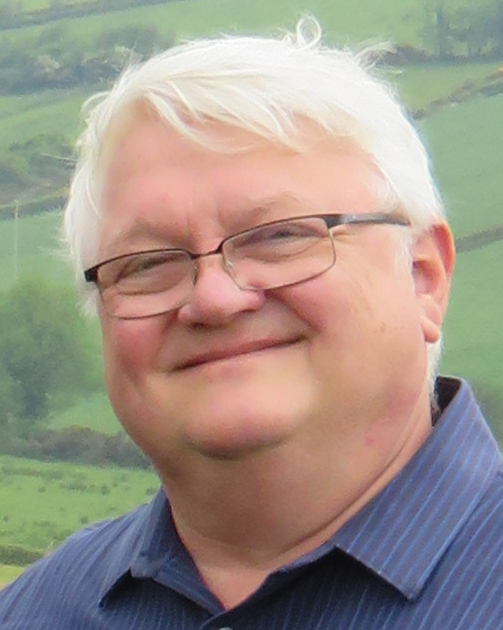
- Born: February 8, 1953 (age 73); Dortmund, Germany
- Education: University of Cologne
- Known for: Biochemical Systems Theory
- Scientific career
- Workplaces: Medical University of South Carolina; Georgia Institute of Technology; University of Texas at Dallas
- Thesis: Modelltheoretische Untersuchungen zur Anordnung der Knospennarben auf der Oberfläche von Hefezellen (1981)
- Doctoral advisor: Heinz-Joachim Pohley; Heinrich Kaiser
- Other academic advisors: Michael Savageau

Eberhard O. Voit (born 8 February 1953) is a Clinical Professor at the University of Texas at Dallas. Until 2024, he was a Professor and David D. Flanagan Chair in Biological Systems at the Georgia Institute of Technology and Emory University and a Georgia Research Alliance Eminent Scholar. He is now a Regents' Emeritus Professor.

== Biography ==
Eberhard Otto Voit was born in Dortmund, Germany. He received the Diplom (Master's of Science) in Biology (Zoology, Genetics, Mathematics; 1976), Philosophikum in Philosophy and Education (1977), Staatsexamen (Master's of Science) in Mathematics (1978), and Dr. rer. nat. (Ph.D.) in Developmental and Theoretical Biology (1981) from the University of Cologne. From 1981 to 1982, he was a postdoctoral fellow in the Department of Microbiology and Immunology at the University of Michigan, Ann Arbor, under the mentorship of Professor Michael Savageau. He was a member of the Men's Glee Club at the University of Michigan.

Voit held research and faculty positions at the University of Cologne, the University of Michigan, the Medical University of South Carolina in Charleston, and at the Cooperative Research Centre for Temperate Hardwood Forestry in Tasmania, Australia. In 2004, he joined the Department of Biomedical Engineering at Georgia Tech and Emory. He is now affiliated with the Department of Biological Sciences at the University of Texas at Dallas.

Voit is a Fellow of the American Association for the Advancement of Science (AAAS), the American Institute for Medical and Biological Engineering (AIMBE) and the Society for Mathematical Biology (SMB). He is furthermore an Overseas Fellow of the Royal Society of Medicine of the United Kingdom. He was named a notable alumnus of the University of Cologne, as well as a Regents' Emeritus Professor at the Georgia Institute of Technology.

== Work ==
Voit is recognized as a leading expert in complex biomedical systems modeling and, in particular, the scientific modeling and systems analysis framework of Biochemical Systems Theory (BST) Voit's team has been developing numerous methodologies within BST and using these, along with other modeling techniques, to analyze biomedical phenomena from microbial dynamics and bacterial metapopulations to diseases like schizophrenia and malaria. He has also worked in the areas of computational statistics and metabolic engineering.

Voit has documented these advancements in about 300 scientific journal articles and book chapters. He is also the author of several books, some with translations into Chinese and Korean, an introductory text for undergraduate and graduate students, and The Inner Workings of Life: Vignettes in Systems Biology a non-technical introduction to systems biology for educated non-experts.

== Bibliography ==
=== Selected publications ===
- Voit, E.O., and T. Radivoyevitch: Biochemical systems analysis of genome-wide expression data, Bioinformatics 16(11), 1023-1037, 2000.
- Voit, E.O., and J.S. Almeida: Decoupling dynamical systems for pathway identification from metabolic profiles. Bioinformatics 20(11), 1670-1681, 2004.
- Alvarez-Vasquez, F., K. J. Sims, L.A. Cowart, Y. Okamoto, E. O. Voit, and Y. A. Hannun. Simulation and evaluation of de novo sphingolipid fluxes in S. cerevisiae. Nature 433(7024), 425-430 (2005).
- Voit, E.O., A.R. Neves, and H. Santos. The intricate side of systems biology. Proc. Natl. Acad. Sci., 103(25), 9452-9457, 2006.
- Goel, G., I-C. Chou, and E.O. Voit: System estimation from metabolic time series data. Bioinformatics 24, 2505-2511, 2008.
- Voit, E.O., W.C. Newstetter, and M.L. Kemp: A feel for systems, Mol. Syst. Biol. 8, 609, 2012.
- Voit, E.O., H.A. Martens, and S.W. Omholt: 150 years of the mass action law. PLoS Comp. Biol. 11(1): e1004012, 2015.
- Faraji, M. and E.O. Voit: Nonparametric dynamic modeling. Math. Biosc. 287, 130-146, 2017.
- Voit, E.O.: The best models of metabolism. WIREs Systems Biology and Medicine2017, e1391.
- Voit, E.O., Perspective: Dimensions of the scientific method. PLoS Comp. Biol. 15(9) : e1007279, 2019.
- Davis, J.D., Kumbale, C.M., Zhang, Q. and E.O. Voit: Dynamical systems approaches to personalized medicine. Curr. Opin. Biotechn. 58, 168-174, 2019.
- Voit, E.O. and D.V. Olivença: Discrete biochemical systems analysis (dBST). Front. Molec. Biosc. 9, 874669, 2022.
- Gupta, A., M.R. Galinski, and E.O. Voit: Dynamic control balancing cell proliferation and inflammation is crucial for an effective immune response to malaria. Front. Molec. Biosc. 8, 800721, 2022.
- Kumbale, C. M., Zhang, Q., & Voit, E. O. (2023). Hepatic cholesterol biosynthesis and dioxin-induced dysregulation: A multiscale computational approach. Food and chemical toxicology, 181, 114086.

=== Books ===
- Voit, E.O. (Ed): Canonical Nonlinear Modeling. S-System Approach to Understanding Complexity, xi+365 pp., Van Nostrand Reinhold, NY, 1991.
- Voit, E.O.: Computational Analysis of Biochemical Systems. A Practical Guide for Biochemists and Molecular Biologists, xii + 530 pp., Cambridge University Press, Cambridge, U.K., 2000.
- Torres, N.V., and E.O. Voit: Pathway Analysis and Optimization in Metabolic Engineering. Cambridge University Press, Cambridge, U.K., 2002.
- Voit, E.O.: A First Course in Systems Biology. Garland Science, New York, NY, 2012, xiv+445pp. Later editions: 2017, 2025.
- Voit, E.O.: The Inner Workings of Life. Vignettes in Systems Biology, xii + 210 pp., Cambridge University Press, Cambridge, U.K., 2016.
- Voit, E.O.: Systems Biology: A Very Short Introduction, Oxford University Press, Cambridge, U.K., 2019.
