= Galuten =

Galuten is a surname. Notable people with the surname include:

- Aaron Galuten (1917–1994), American mathematician
- Albhy Galuten (born 1947), American musician

== See also ==
- Gluten, a type of protein
