= Journal of the American Mathematical Society =

- Discipline: Pure and applied mathematics
- Language: English
- Edited by: Laura DeMarco, Mohammed Abouzaid, Lawrence Guth, Sylvia Serfaty, Richard Taylor, Valentino Tosatti, Burt Totaro

Publication details
- History: 1988-present
- Publisher: American Mathematical Society (United States)
- Frequency: Quarterly
- Impact factor: 4.692 (2016)

Standard abbreviations
- ISO 4: J. Am. Math. Soc.
- MathSciNet: J. Amer. Math. Soc.

Indexing
- ISSN: 1088-6834 (print); 0894-0347 (web)
- LCCN: 88648217
- OCLC no.: 1088-6834

Links
- Journal homepage; Online access and archive

The Journal of the American Mathematical Society (JAMS) is a quarterly peer-reviewed mathematical journal published by the American Mathematical Society.

In January 1986, the Council and the Board of Trustees of the American Mathematical Society authorized the founding of a new journal, intended to join the ranks of outstanding journals of the field.. The name Journal of the American Mathematical Society was chosen, and the first issue was January 1988, the centennial year of the society. The initial editors were H. Blaine Lawson. Michael Artin, Richard Melrose, Wilfried Schmid, and Robert Tarjan.

== Abstracting and indexing ==
This journal is abstracted and indexed in:

- Mathematical Reviews
- Zentralblatt MATH
- Science Citation Index
- ISI Alerting Services
- CompuMath Citation Index
- Current Contents/Physical, Chemical & Earth Sciences.

According to the Journal Citation Reports, the journal has a 2020 impact factor of 5.318, ranking it 2nd out of 330 journals in the category "Mathematics".

== See also ==
- Bulletin of the American Mathematical Society
- Memoirs of the American Mathematical Society
- Notices of the American Mathematical Society
- Proceedings of the American Mathematical Society
- Transactions of the American Mathematical Society
