= Memoirs of the American Mathematical Society =

- Discipline: Mathematics
- Language: English

Publication details
- History: 1950–present
- Publisher: American Mathematical Society
- Frequency: Monthly

Standard abbreviations
- ISO 4: Mem. Am. Math. Soc.
- MathSciNet: Mem. Amer. Math. Soc.

Indexing
- CODEN: MAMCAU
- ISSN: 0065-9266 (print); 1947-6221 (web)
- LCCN: 52042839

Links
- Journal homepage

Memoirs of the American Mathematical Society is a mathematical journal published by the American Mathematical Society and intended to carry peer-reviewed book-length research publications (monographs). As such, it has been described as having the characteristics both of a journal and of a book series. As with other journals, its publications are collected into volumes, numbering six per year until 2024 and twelve per year from 2025 on. The start of the journal was announced in 1949, and it began publication in 1950.

The journal is indexed by Mathematical Reviews, Zentralblatt MATH, Science Citation Index, Research Alert, CompuMath Citation Index, and Current Contents. Its dual nature as a journal and a book series has sometimes caused inconsistencies in its indexing.

== Other journals from the AMS ==
- Bulletin of the American Mathematical Society
- Journal of the American Mathematical Society
- Notices of the American Mathematical Society
- Proceedings of the American Mathematical Society
- Transactions of the American Mathematical Society
