= Transactions of the American Mathematical Society =

- Discipline: Mathematics
- Language: English
- Edited by: Dan Abramovich

Publication details
- History: 1900–present
- Publisher: American Mathematical Society
- Frequency: Monthly

Standard abbreviations
- ISO 4: Trans. Am. Math. Soc.
- MathSciNet: Trans. Amer. Math. Soc.

Indexing
- CODEN: TAMTAM
- ISSN: 0002-9947 (print); 1088-6850 (web)
- LCCN: 12030243
- JSTOR: tranamermathsoci
- OCLC no.: 1480369

Links
- Journal homepage

The Transactions of the American Mathematical Society is a monthly peer-reviewed scientific journal of pure and applied mathematics published by the American Mathematical Society. It was established in 1900. As a requirement, all articles must be more than 15 printed pages. Its ISSN number is 0002-9947.

== See also ==
- Bulletin of the American Mathematical Society
- Journal of the American Mathematical Society
- Memoirs of the American Mathematical Society
- Notices of the American Mathematical Society
- Proceedings of the American Mathematical Society
