= Emory McClintock =

American actuary

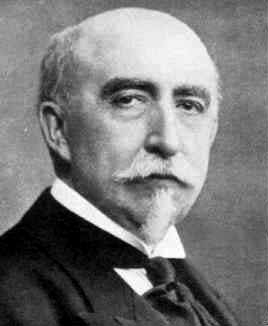
Emory McClintock

Emory McClintock (1840–1916), born John Emory McClintock was an American actuary, born in Carlisle, Pennsylvania. He graduated from Columbia University, where he was tutor in mathematics in 1859–1860. At Columbia, Emory McClintock was a member of the Philolexian Society, the college's literary and debate society. From 1863 to 1866 he served as United States consular agent at Bradford, England. He served as president of the American Mathematical Society in 1890–1894 and of the Actuarial Society of America in 1895–1897.

== Early life and career ==
He was born to John and Caroline Augusta Wakeman McClintock. His father was a minister of the Methodist Episcopal Church, who was also a professor of mathematics, and ancient languages at Dickinson College in Carlisle. His father was also involved in an 1847 a riot over slavery, as he tried to prevent slavechasers from taking African-American citizens of Pennsylvania into slavery. He was actuary of the Asbury Life Insurance Company, New York (1867–1871), of the Northwestern Mutual Life Insurance Company, Milwaukee, Wisconsin, (1871–1889), and of the Mutual Life Insurance Company, New York (1889–1911).

At the Mutual, he was vice president from 1905 to 1911, a trustee after 1905, and a consulting actuary after 1911.
