= Henry Seely White =

American mathematician

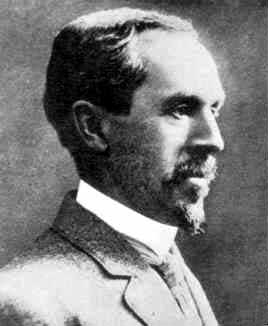

Henry Seely White (May 20, 1861 – May 20, 1943) was an American mathematician. He was born in Cazenovia, New York to parents Aaron White and Isadore Maria Haight. He matriculated at Wesleyan University in Connecticut and graduated with honors in 1882 at the age of twenty-one. White excelled at Wesleyan in astronomy, ethics, Latin, logic, mathematics, and philosophy. At the university, John Monroe Van Vleck taught White mathematics and astronomy. Later, Van Vleck persuaded White to continue to study mathematics at the graduate level. Subsequently, White studied at the University of Göttingen under Klein, and received his doctorate in 1891.

White was Mathematics Department Chair at Northwestern University. He left Northwestern to be near his ill mother and became Chairman of the Mathematics Department at Vassar College. He "attributed his interest in geometry both to his work at Wesleyan and Goettingen and to summers spent working on his grandfather's farm." His particular interests were in the fields of the geometry of curves and surfaces (curves, differential geometry of surfaces), algebraic planes and twisted curves (algebraic geometry, algebraic curves, twisted curves), homeomorphic sets of lines in a plane (line coordinates), the theory of invariants, relativity in mechanics, and correspondences.

White became president of the American Mathematical Society for 1907–1908. In 1915 White was elected a Fellow of the United States National Academy of Sciences. Northwestern conferred upon him an LL.D. in the same year. At the time of its 100th anniversary in 1932, Wesleyan conferred upon him a D.Sc.

== Writings ==
- Linear systems of curves on algebraic surfaces in The Boston colloquium: lectures on mathematics delivered from September 2 to 5, 1903, before members of the American mathematical society, edited by Thomas Scott Fiske and William Fogg Osgood p. 1 (American Mathematical Society, 1903)
- Plane Curves of the Third Order. 1925.
