= Proceedings of the American Mathematical Society =

- Discipline: Mathematics
- Language: English

Publication details
- History: 1950-present
- Publisher: American Mathematical Society (United States of America)
- Frequency: Monthly
- Impact factor: 0.813 (2018)

Standard abbreviations
- ISO 4: Proc. Am. Math. Soc.
- MathSciNet: Proc. Amer. Math. Soc.

Indexing
- CODEN: PAMYAR
- ISSN: 0002-9939 (print); 1088-6826 (web)
- LCCN: 51003937
- OCLC no.: 1480367

Links
- Journal homepage

Proceedings of the American Mathematical Society is a monthly peer-reviewed scientific journal of mathematics published by the American Mathematical Society. The journal is devoted to shorter research articles. As a requirement, all articles must be at most 15 printed pages.

According to the Journal Citation Reports, the journal has a 2018 impact factor of 0.813.

== Scope ==
Proceedings of the American Mathematical Society publishes articles from all areas of pure and applied mathematics, including topology, geometry, analysis, algebra, number theory, combinatorics, logic, probability and statistics.

== Abstracting and indexing ==
This journal is indexed in the following databases:

- Mathematical Reviews
- Zentralblatt MATH
- Science Citation Index
- Science Citation Index Expanded
- ISI Alerting Services
- CompuMath Citation Index
- Current Contents / Physical, Chemical & Earth Sciences.

== Other journals from the American Mathematical Society ==
- Bulletin of the American Mathematical Society
- Memoirs of the American Mathematical Society
- Notices of the American Mathematical Society
- Journal of the American Mathematical Society
- Transactions of the American Mathematical Society
