= Osgood's lemma =

Proposition in complex analysis

In mathematics, specifically complex analysis, Osgood's lemma states that a continuous function of several complex variables that is holomorphic in each variable separately is itself holomorphic. It was introduced by William Fogg Osgood in 1899.

The assumption that the function is continuous can be dropped, but that form of the lemma is much harder to prove and is known as Hartogs' theorem.

There is no analogue of this result for real variables. If it is assumed that a function $f:\mathbb{R}^n\to\mathbb{R}$ is globally continuous and separately differentiable on each variable (all partial derivatives exist everywhere), it is not true that $f$ will necessarily be differentiable. A counterexample in two dimensions is given by

$$f(x,y)=\dfrac{2x^2y+y^3}{x^2+y^2}.$$

If in addition it is defined that $f(0,0)=0$, this function is everywhere continuous and has well-defined partial derivatives in $x$ and $y$ everywhere (also at the origin), but is not differentiable at the origin.
