= Hartogs's theorem on separate holomorphicity =

Mathematical theorem

In mathematics, Hartogs's theorem is a fundamental result of Friedrich Hartogs in the theory of several complex variables. Roughly speaking, it states that a 'separately analytic' function is continuous. More precisely, if $F:{\textbf{C}}^n \to {\textbf{C}}$ is a function which is analytic in each variable z_{i}, 1 ≤ i ≤ n, while the other variables are held constant, then F is a continuous function.

A corollary is that the function F is then in fact an analytic function in the n-variable sense (i.e. that locally it has a Taylor expansion). Therefore, 'separate analyticity' and 'analyticity' are coincident notions, in the theory of several complex variables.

Starting with the extra hypothesis that the function is continuous (or bounded), the theorem is much easier to prove and in this form is known as Osgood's lemma.

There is no analogue of this theorem for real variables. If we assume that a function $f \colon {\textbf{R}}^n \to {\textbf{R}}$ is differentiable (or even analytic) in each variable separately, it is not true that $f$ will necessarily be continuous. A counterexample in two dimensions is given by

$$f(x,y) = \frac{xy}{x^2+y^2}.$$

If in addition we define $f(0,0)=0$, this function has well-defined partial derivatives in $x$ and $y$ at the origin, but it is not continuous at origin. (Indeed, the limits along the lines $x=y$ and $x=-y$ are not equal, so there is no way to extend the definition of $f$ to include the origin and have the function be continuous there.)
