= Catherine A. Roberts =

American mathematician

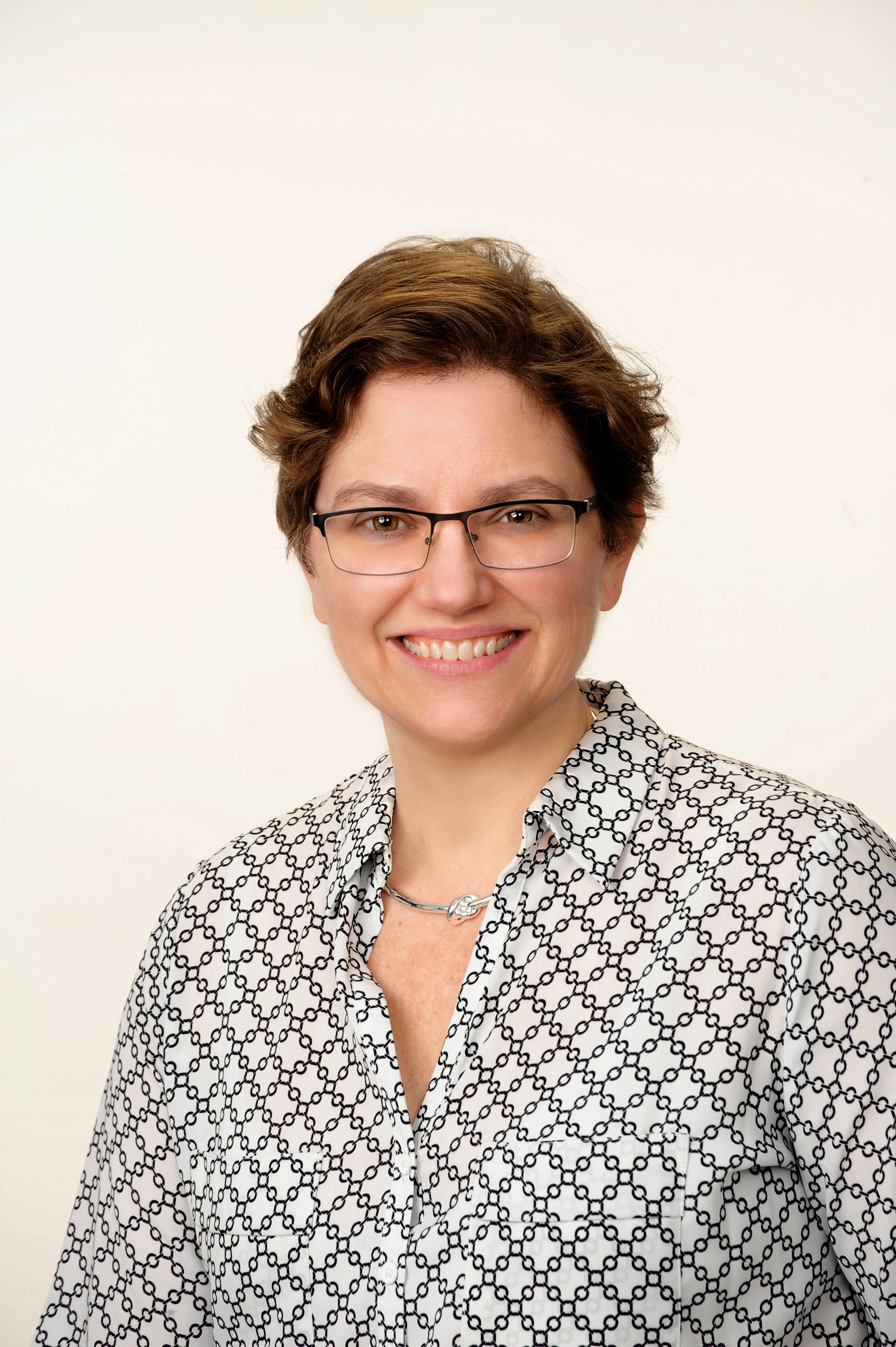
- Roberts in 2017
- Born: February 5, 1965 (age 61); Boston, Massachusetts, U.S.
- Education: Bowdoin College (BA); Northwestern University (PhD)
- Known for: nonlinear Volterra integral equations, natural resource modeling
- Scientific career
- Fields: Applied mathematics
- Workplaces: University of Rhode Island; Northern Arizona University; College of the Holy Cross
- Doctoral advisor: W. Edward Olmstead

Catherine A. Roberts (born February 5, 1965) is an American mathematician who was the first woman executive director of the American Mathematical Society. She is a professor at the College of the Holy Cross.

== Early life and education ==
Roberts was born in 1965 in Boston, Massachusetts. Her family subsequently moved to Cape Cod, Massachusetts, where her father opened a law practice and her mother became an important civic leader and social advocate in the community. Roberts and her spouse, a chemistry professor at Worcester Polytechnic Institute, have two sons.

Roberts graduated from Bowdoin College in 1987 with a Bachelor of Arts, magna cum laude, in mathematics and art history, along with a teacher certification in math. She graduated from Northwestern University in 1992 with a Ph.D. in applied mathematics and engineering sciences.

== Academic career ==
Roberts was an assistant professor of mathematics at the University of Rhode Island from 1992 until 1995. She then was appointed an assistant professor at Northern Arizona University from 1995 to 1998 and from 1998 to 2001 she worked as an associate professor at the university. Roberts was appointed an associate professor at the College of the Holy Cross from 2001 to 2013, full professor from 2013 to 2018, and faculty associate starting in 2018. From 2004 to 2016 she was the Editor-in-Chief of the journal Natural Resource Modeling, the official journa of the Resource Modeling Association. From 2016 to 2023, Roberts was the executive director of American Mathematical Society. In this capacity, she led the Society through a multi-year strategic plan resulting in the introduction of new branding (including a logo and the tag line "Advancing Research. Creating Connections.", and the establishment of offices of Membership, Communications, and Equity/Diversity/Inclusion. Under her leadership, several new prizes, awards, and programs were developed, including the Next Generation Fund and the open-access journal Communications of the AMS.

== Recognition ==
Roberts was selected as a Fellow of the Association for Women in Mathematics in the Class of 2021 "for leadership in the AWM and the American Mathematical Society; and for promoting women in mathematics at every career stage, both by mentoring individuals to become strong and confident mathematicians and by working for systemic change".
