= Biochemical systems theory =

Mathematical modeling of biochemical systems

Biochemical systems theory is a mathematical modelling framework for biochemical systems, based on ordinary differential equations (ODE), in which biochemical processes are represented using power-law expansions in the variables of the system.

This framework, which became known as Biochemical Systems Theory, has been developed since the 1960s by Michael Savageau, Eberhard Voit and others for the systems analysis of biochemical processes. According to Cornish-Bowden (2007) they "regarded this as a general theory of metabolic control, which includes both metabolic control analysis and flux-oriented theory as special cases".

== Representation ==
The dynamics of a species is represented by a differential equation with the structure:

$\frac{dX_i}{dt}=\sum_j \mu_{ij} \cdot \gamma_j \prod_k X_k^{f_{jk}}\,$

where X_{i} represents one of the n_{d} variables of the model (metabolite concentrations, protein concentrations or levels of gene expression). j represents the n_{f} biochemical processes affecting the dynamics of the species. On the other hand, $\mu$_{ij} (stoichiometric coefficient), $\gamma$_{j} (rate constants) and f_{jk} (kinetic orders) are two different kinds of parameters defining the dynamics of the system.

The principal difference of power-law models with respect to other ODE models used in biochemical systems is that the kinetic orders can be non-integer numbers. A kinetic order can have even negative value when inhibition is modeled. In this way, power-law models have a higher flexibility to reproduce the non-linearity of biochemical systems.

Models using power-law expansions have been used during the last 35 years to model and analyze several kinds of biochemical systems including metabolic networks, genetic networks and recently in cell signalling.

== See also ==
- Dynamical systems
- Ludwig von Bertalanffy
- Systems theory

== Literature ==
Books:

- M.A. Savageau, Biochemical systems analysis: a study of function and design in molecular biology, Reading, MA, Addison–Wesley, 1976.
- E.O. Voit (ed), Canonical Nonlinear Modeling. S-System Approach to Understanding Complexity, Van Nostrand Reinhold, NY, 1991.
- E.O. Voit, Computational Analysis of Biochemical Systems. A Practical Guide for Biochemists and Molecular Biologists, Cambridge University Press, Cambridge, U.K., 2000.
- N.V. Torres and E.O. Voit, Pathway Analysis and Optimization in Metabolic Engineering, Cambridge University Press, Cambridge, U.K., 2002.

Scientific articles:

- M.A. Savageau, Biochemical systems analysis: I. Some mathematical properties of the rate law for the component enzymatic reactions in: J. Theor. Biol. 25, pp. 365–369, 1969.
- M.A. Savageau, Development of fractal kinetic theory for enzyme-catalysed reactions and implications for the design of biochemical pathways in: Biosystems 47(1-2), pp. 9–36, 1998.
- M.R. Atkinson et al., Design of gene circuits using power-law models, in: Cell 113, pp. 597–607, 2003.
- F. Alvarez-Vasquez et al., Simulation and validation of modelled sphingolipid metabolism in Saccharomyces cerevisiae, Nature 27, pp. 433(7024), pp. 425–30, 2005.
- J. Vera et al., Power-Law models of signal transduction pathways in: Cellular Signalling doi:10.1016/j.cellsig.2007.01.029), 2007.
- Eberhart O. Voit, Applications of Biochemical Systems Theory, 2006.
