= John Howard Van Amringe (sculpture) =

Sculpture in Manhattan, New York, U.S.

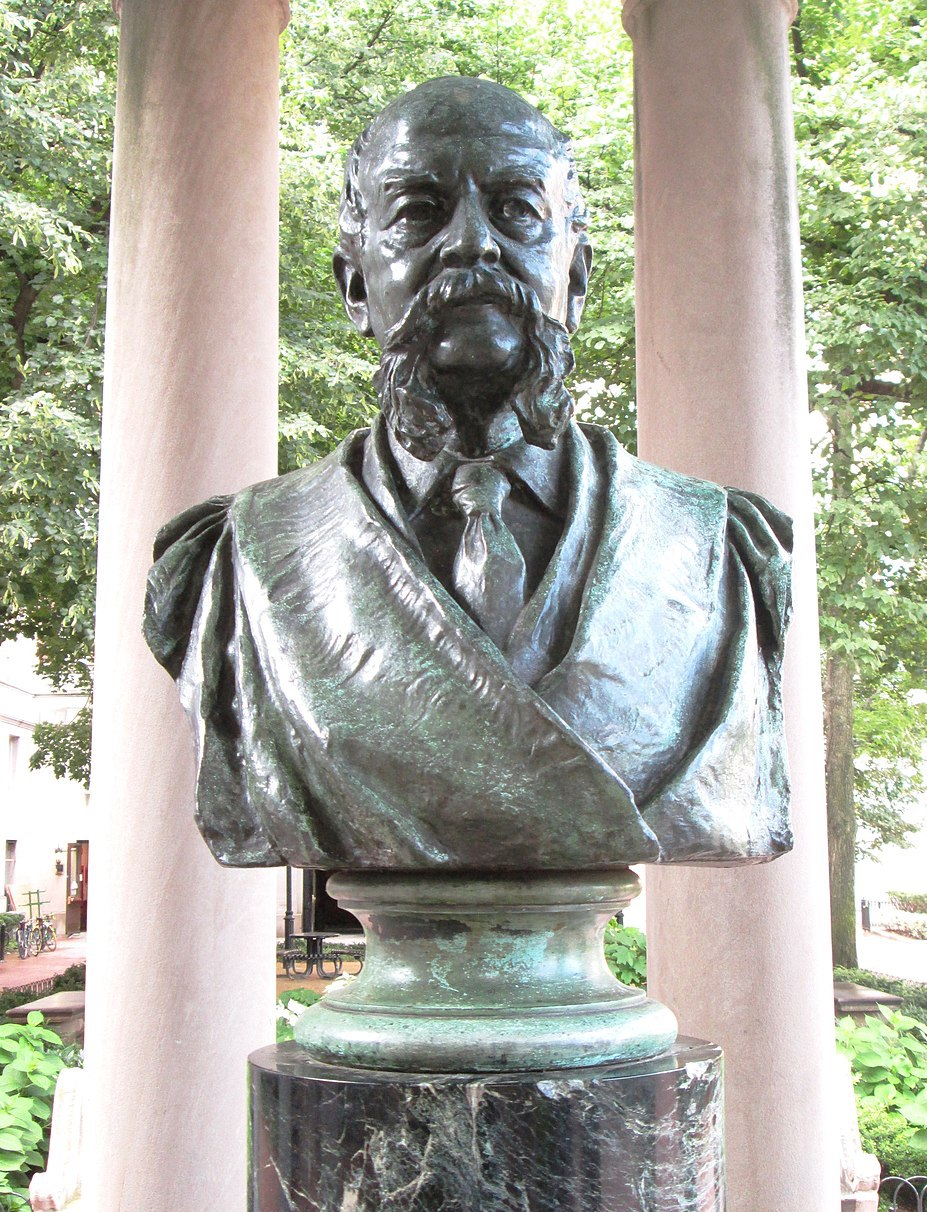
- The bust in 2014
- Artist: William Ordway Partridge
- Year: 1912
- Medium: Bronze on green marble pedestal
- Subject: John Howard Van Amringe
- Dimensions: 70 cm × 58 cm × 38 cm (28 in × 23 in × 15 in)
- Location: Columbia University, New York City, New York
- 40.806342°N 73.962037°W

John Howard Van Amringe, also known as the Van Amringe Memorial, is an outdoor bust depicting the American educator and mathematician of the same name, installed at Van Amringe Quadrangle on the Columbia University campus in Upper Manhattan, New York City. It was sculpted by William Ordway Partridge in 1912, and installed on Commencement Day in June 1922.

On June 8, 1962, the bust was toppled off of its pedestal by vandals and received extensive damage. It was repaired or replaced, and reinstalled in December of that year.

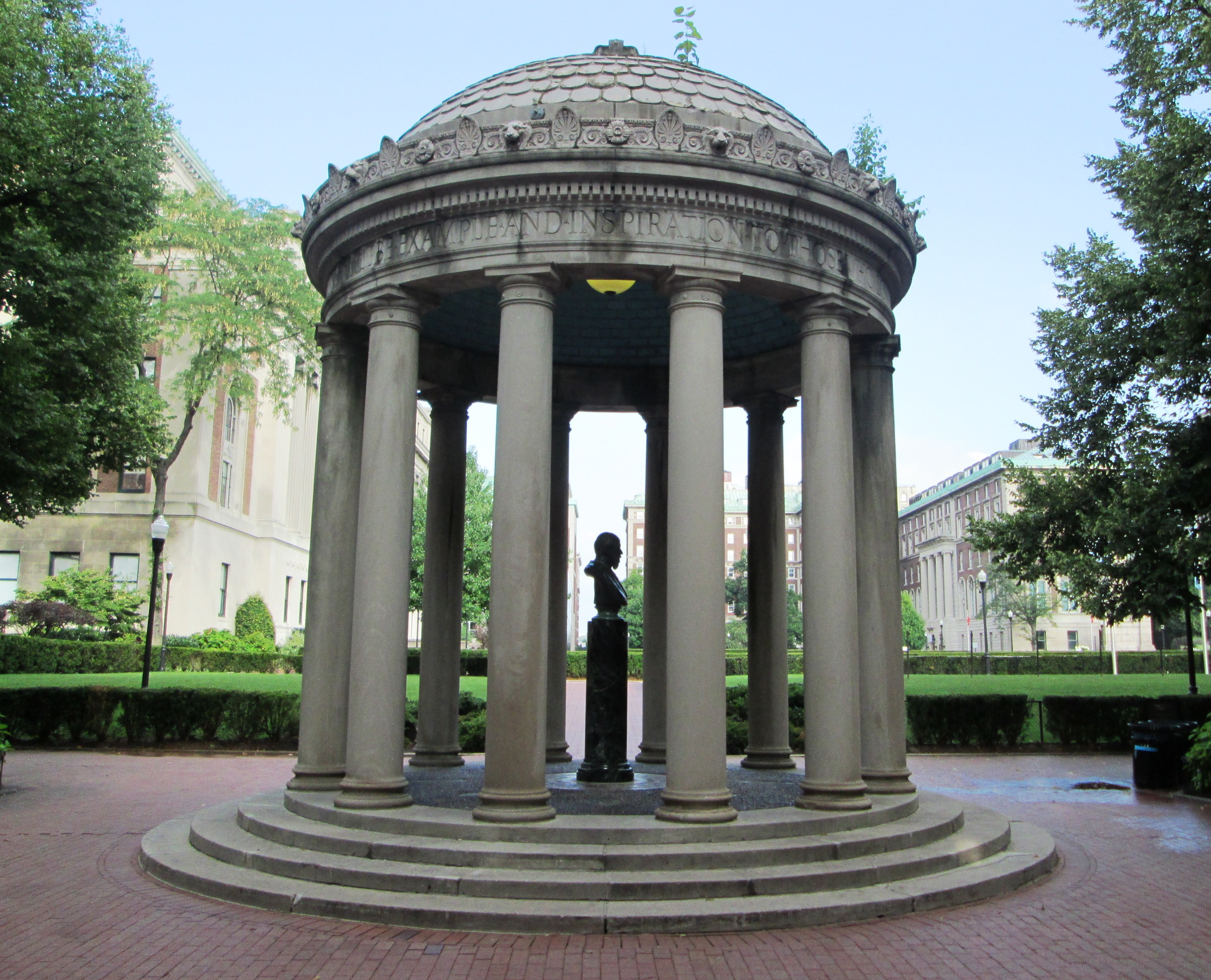
The memorial in 2014
