= Marion Walter =

German-born mathematics educator (1928–2021)

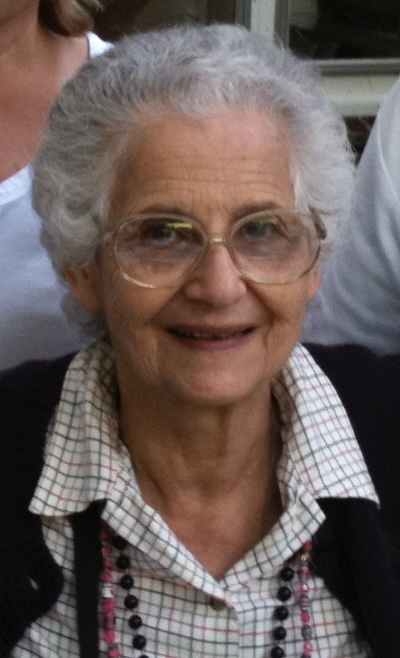
- Photo by Kenneth Helphand
- Born: 30 July 1928; Berlin, Germany
- Died: May 9, 2021 (aged 92); Eugene, Oregon, US
- Citizenship: United States
- Education: New York University M.S.; Harvard Graduate School of Education Ed.D.
- Scientific career
- Fields: Mathematics education
- Thesis: Two Samples of Informal Geometry for Young Children (1967)

Marion Walter (30 July 1928 – 9 May 2021) was an internationally-known mathematics educator and professor of mathematics at the University of Oregon in Eugene, Oregon. There is a theorem named after her, called Marion Walter's Theorem or just Marion's Theorem as it is affectionately known.

== Early life ==
Marion Walter was born in Berlin, Germany in 1928 to Erna and Willy Walter. Her father was a prosperous merchant who specialized in costume jewelry. In 1936, when the Nazis were gaining strength in Germany and it was no longer possible for Jews to attend public school, she and her sister, Ellen, were sent to a Jewish boarding school called Landschulheim Herrlingen in the village of Herrlingen, a suburb of Ulm. The book Education towards spiritual resistance: The Jewish Landschulheim Herrlingen, 1933 to 1939 by Lucie Schachne documents this remarkable school, which was closed in 1939.

On March 15, 1939, Marion and Ellen Walter were sent on a Kindertransport to England, where they attended a Church of England boarding school in Eastbourne, on the southeastern coast of England. Marion and Ellen Walter were reunited with their parents in England. After England entered World War II, in 1940 her father was sent to internment on the Isle of Man. He died there in 1943.

Eastbourne was in the path of a possible German invasion of England and all students at the boarding school were evacuated. Walter was sent to a school in the hamlet of Wykey in Shropshire, which was in a large country house where they bred cocker spaniels. She slept on an air mattress in a white-washed kennel. She was moved two more times. The last place she resided in was Combermere Abbey in Cheshire, which was acquired by Sir Kenneth Crossley. After Walter completed her schooling at the age of sixteen in December 1944, the school's only mathematics teacher resigned. Since it was difficult to find a replacement during the war period, Walter was asked to teach math, in part because she had earned a mark of distinction on her Cambridge University School Certificate exam. She taught for two terms and found she enjoyed teaching.

== Education and career ==
Walter attended college in England for two years before leaving for the United States in 1948 with her mother and sister. The family arrived in New York City in January 1948. She then attended Hunter College, majoring in mathematics and minoring in education, graduating with a B.A. in 1950. Ellen Walter returned to England to get married.

After graduating from Hunter, Walter taught at Hunter College High School and George Washington High School.

In the summers of 1952 and 1953, Walter was awarded a National Bureau of Standards summer scholarship to study at the Institute of Numerical Analysis at UCLA. The main purpose of the Institute, sponsored by the National Bureau of Standards and funded by the Office of Naval Research, was to work towards the further development of high-speed automatic digital computing machinery. The senior staff at the Institute included D.H. Lehmer (director), Mark Kac, Irving Kaplansky, and A Adrian Albert. During the second summer at the institute, she met Olga Taussky-Todd who became her mentor and encouraged her to complete her master's degree. Marshall Hall Jr. joined the senior staff of the Institute in 1953. Walter took many photographs of prominent mathematicians during her summers at the Institute. These photographs are now part of the Marion Walter Collection at the Archives of American Mathematics on the campus of the University of Texas at Austin.

Walter took evening classes for a master's degree in mathematics at New York University. In order to support herself during this time, she worked as a research assistant, mainly doing computing work at what became the Courant Institute. She earned her M.S. in mathematics from New York University in 1954.

In 1954, Walter accepted a teaching assistantship in the mathematics department at Cornell University in Ithaca, New York; she remained at Cornell until 1956. In 1956, she took a one-year appointment at Simmons College in Boston, Massachusetts; she ended up staying at Simmons for nine years. Back in 1956, the college did not have a major in mathematics or a formal math department. Walter created both the math major and the mathematics department at Simmons. She stepped down as department chair after four years, remaining there teaching until 1965 when she left to concentrate on her doctorate at Harvard Graduate School of Education. She retained close relationships with her students from Simmons over the years; several of the first math majors stayed in touch with her until her death. One of those students was Lenore Blum, who was a distinguished career professor of computer science at Carnegie Mellon University. Simmons will archive Walter's personal papers.

In 1960, during her tenure at Simmons, Walter received a fellowship to attend the National Science Foundation Summer Program at Stanford University in Palo Alto, California. At Stanford, she met and was taught by the mathematician George Pólya. Walter considered these summer programs to be one of the highlights of her career.

Also during her years at Simmons, Walter began working on her doctoral degree at the Harvard Graduate School of Education (HGSE) in Cambridge, Massachusetts. She earned her Ed.D. in mathematics education from HGSE in 1967. After completing her doctorate, she accepted an appointment at HGSE to teach prospective teachers of mathematics at the elementary and high school level in the Master of Arts in Teaching Program.

In 1967, Dr. Walter formed a group called the Boston Area Math Specialist (BAMS) which gives monthly workshops for practicing teachers. The members of the group share methods, techniques, new learnings and their successes. She was a mathematics consultant to the project that became Sesame Street.

The Master of Arts in Teaching Program at HGSE was terminated in 1972. Dr. Walter subsequently accepted various positions, virtually none of which she formally applied for.

During her early days at Harvard, Walter met fellow student Stephen I. Brown and began a lifetime collaboration with him. They developed a new course on problem posing over several years; their work resulted in the publication of The Art of Problem Posing in 1983. The book is now in its third edition.

Dr. Walter was actively involved in a group that was formed in Cambridge, Massachusetts called The Philopmorphs, which met at the Carpenter Center for the Visual Arts. The group discussed form in nature, science, and art. Walter has a long-term interest in the visual arts. In Eugene, Oregon, she started the Philomorphs West which met for several years.

In 1977, Dr. Walter accepted a teaching position at University of Oregon in Eugene, Oregon, where she remained until her retirement in 1994. At Oregon, Walter focused on preparing prospective elementary school teachers to teach mathematics. She stressed the discovery approach and used hands-on/experiment methods. She refused to teach in a classroom with individual desks for students, but rather had tables in the classroom where students could conduct activities in groups. You can get an idea of what Dr. Walter stressed by looking at the titles of her journal publications. Many of her students from Oregon became K-12 mathematics teachers and she maintained close relationships with them.

Walter published over 40 journal articles and gave nearly 100 workshops and talks in the United States, Canada, England, Denmark, Hungary, and Israel.

== Recognition ==
In 1993, Marion Walter's Theorem was named for her after she and a colleague discovered the result while experimenting with Geometer's Sketchpad. The theorem states that if each side of an arbitrary triangle is trisected and lines are drawn to the opposite vertices, the area of the hexagon created in the middle is one-tenth the area of the original triangle.

In 2003, Marion Walter was nominated by BAMS and subsequently elected to the Massachusetts Hall of Fame for Mathematics Educators.

In 2010, Dr. Walter was awarded an honorary degree from Simmons and with her help and other donors the Marion Walter Future of Mathematics Awards at Simmons was created to recognize math majors who had an interest in becoming high school math teachers.

In 2015, the University of Oregon Department of Mathematics created the Marion Walter Future Teachers Award, which is given annually to a graduating math major with a secondary education focus. The first award was given at the spring 2016 graduation ceremony.

== Selected books ==
Walter wrote several children's books on using mirrors to explore symmetry, birthday books that explored particular ages, and a well-regarded book on problem posing with her long-term collaborator Stephen I. Brown.

- Walter, Marion (December 17, 1970). The Magic Mirror Book (1st ed.). Scholastic. ISBN 978-0590415392.
- Walter, Marion (June 1, 1972). Make a Bigger Puddle, Make a Smaller Worm. M Evans & Co. ISBN 978-0871310736. (honourable mention from the New York Academy of Science Children's Book Award Program)
- Walter, Marion (June 1, 1972). Look at Annette. M Evans & Company. p. 32. ISBN 978-0871310712.
- Walter, Marion (August 21, 1975). Another, Another, Another and More. Scholastic.
- Walter, Marion (October 2, 1985). The Mirror Puzzle Book. Tarquin. ISBN 978-0906212394. (honourable mention from the New York Academy of Science Children's Book Award Program)
- Walter, Marion I. (June 1, 1996). Boxes, Squares and Other Things. Natl Council of Teachers of Mathematics. ISBN 978-0873534093.
- Brown, Stephen I.; Walter, Marion I. (December 9, 2004). The Art of Problem Posing (3rd ed.). New York: Routledge, Taylor & Francis Group. ISBN 978-0805849776.
  - Review by Nat Banting
  - Problem posing:a review of sorts by Geneviève Barabé and Jérôme Proulx

For other books by Marion Walter see her page on WorldCat .

== Selected journal articles ==
- Walter, Marion I.; Brown, Stephen I. (1971). "Mathematical Education:Missing Ingredients in Teacher Training: One Remedy". Amer. Math. Monthly. 78 (4). Mathematical Association of America: 399–404. doi:10.1080/00029890.1971.11992775. MR 1536294.
- Walter, Marion (1981). "Exploring a rectangle problem". Mathematics Magazine. 54 (3). Mathematics Association of America: 131–134. doi:10.1080/0025570X.1981.11976914. MR 0618599.
- Walter, Marion (1988). "Constructing polyhedra without being told how to!". Shaping Space. Design Sci. Collect., Pro Scientia Viva Title. Vol. 64. Boston, MA: Birkhäuser Boston. pp. 44–50. MR 0937071.
- Walter, Marion (September 2001). "Curriculum Topics Through Problem Posing". Mathematics Teacher. 128. The Association of Teachers of Mathematics: 23.
- Walter, Marion (March 2003). "Changing "Drill" to Thinking". Mathematics Teacher. 182. The Association of Teachers of Mathematics: 36–39.
- Walter, Marion (April 2004). "Mathematics Detective:Math With Love". Mathematics Teaching in the Middle School. 9 (8). National Council of Teachers of Mathematics: 418–420. doi:10.5951/MTMS.9.8.0418.
- Fallstrom, Scott; Walter, Marion (March 2011). "Finding Conjectures Using Geometer's Sketchpad". Mathematics Teaching. 221. The Association of Teachers of Mathematics: 19–21.
- Libeskind, Shlomo; Walter, Marion (February 2017). "Multiple solutions lead to the discovery of new truths". Mathematics Teacher. 255. The Association of Teachers of Mathematics: 33–35.
