= Chelsea Publishing Company =

American publisher

- Founded: 1944; 81 years ago
- Founder: Aaron Galuten
- Defunct: 1997; 28 years ago
- Successor: American Mathematical Society
- Country of origin: United States
- Headquarters location: New York City
- Publication types: Books
- Official website: bookstore.ams.org/CHEL

The Chelsea Publishing Company was a publisher of mathematical books, based in New York City, founded in 1944 by Aaron Galuten while he was still a graduate student at Columbia. Its initial focus was to republish important European works that were unavailable in the United States because of wartime restrictions, such as Hausdorff's Mengenlehre, or because the works were out of print. This soon expanded to include translations of such works into English, as well as original works by American authors. As of 1985, the company's catalog included more than 200 titles.

After Galuten's death in 1994, the company was acquired in 1997 by the AMS, which continues to publish a portion of the company's original catalog under the AMS Chelsea Publishing banner, and also publishes new titles under this imprint.
