= Elisha Scott Loomis =

American teacher and mathematician (1852-1940)

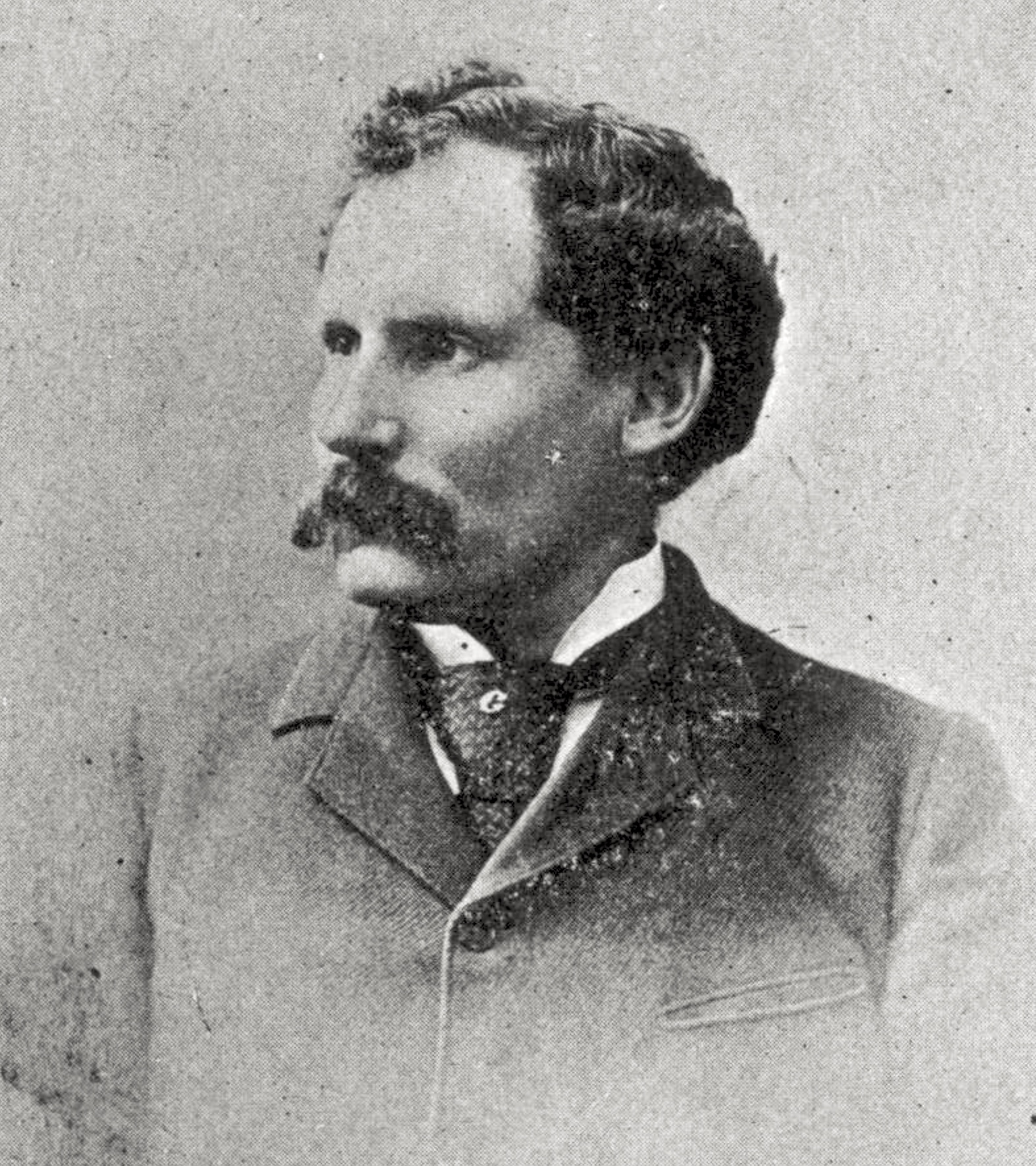
Elisha Scott Loomis 1894

Elisha Scott Loomis (September 18, 1852 – December 11, 1940) was an American teacher, mathematician, genealogist, writer and engineer.

== Ancestry and early life ==
Elisha Scott Loomis, of English–Scottish and Pennsylvania Dutch ancestry, was born in a log cabin in Wadsworth, Ohio, which at that time was a village in Medina County. He was the eldest son of Charles W. Loomis, a descendant of the pioneer Joseph Loomis of Windsor, Connecticut.

His mother was Sarah Oberholtzer, descendant of pioneer Jacob Oberholtzer, of Montgomery County, Pennsylvania. When Loomis was 12, his father died. By that time he had six younger brothers and a sister, and for seven years from the age of 13 he helped his mother make ends meet by working as a farm laborer during summertime. Four months each winter he attended district schools, working for his board while doing so. During his schooldays he wished to learn algebra, and as his district school teacher knew no algebra, he walked several miles to a neighboring town where he bought Joseph Ray's Elementary Algebra. He proceeded to master the material without any support except encouragement of his mother, who had had too little schooling to learn to write.

Loomis proved to be a sufficiently apt scholar to become a teacher himself in 1873. He taught during the summer and managed not only to save enough money to help his mother support her family, but also for himself to attend and assist at Baldwin University at Berea, Ohio, during the winter. His industry and thrift enabled him to buy a home in Shreve, Ohio where he established his mother and brothers the fall of 1876. This was partly possible because of his abstemious habits, eschewing both tobacco and strong drink. He joined the Presbyterian church early in his adult life, but later converted to Methodism.

After he attained his B.S. degree in mid-1880, Loomis married a teacher from Loudonville, Ohio, Miss Letitia E. Shire.

== Further education and career ==
While teaching, Loomis continued his own studies and earned postgraduate degrees. While in Berea, studied civil engineering and became the village engineer. He attained his B.S. at Baldwin University in 1880 under Professor Aaron Schuyler, and then his A.M. in 1886 and Ph.D. in 1888 from Wooster University in Ohio. In 1900, the Cleveland Law School awarded him the LL.B. degree, and he was admitted to the State Bar in June 1900.

From 1880 to 1885 he served as principal, first at the Burbank Academy in Burbank, Ohio, then at the Richfield Township High School, in Summit County, Ohio. In 1885, he accepted the chair of mathematics in Baldwin University, succeeding Professor Aaron Schuyler, where he served for ten years.

In 1895, he accepted the post of head of the Mathematics Department at West High School, Cleveland, Ohio, where he taught for 29 years, not retiring until 1923 as required by law for Ohio state teachers. In writing his own obituary, he estimated that in his 50 years as a teacher he had ploughed "habit-formation grooves in the plastic brains" of over 4,000 boys and girls and young men and women and said that he prized the title of "Teacher" more than any other honor.

== Written works ==
His written works included his thesis for his Ph.D. degree in metaphysics: "Theism the Result of Completed Investigation", a genealogy of "The Loomis Family in America", and "The Genealogy of Jacob Oberholtzer and His Descendants"'. He also wrote "The Teaching of Mathematics in High Schools", and "Original Investigation Or How to Attack an Exercise in Geometry". Possibly his best-known work however, is "The Pythagorean Proposition", in which he collected, classified, and discussed 344 proofs of the Pythagorean theorem. As a note on the standard "rearrangement proof", Loomis attributes this proof to a high-school boy named Maurice Laisnez. The book is still a work of reference. In 2021, the book was published in a revised and expanded version in German. Also he prepared in manuscript, ready for publication, books and articles estimated to number over one hundred, but it is not clear how many of them ever were printed. Titles that he mentioned include: "Recollections and Reflections of a Log-Cabin Boy", "This and That, from 50 Years of Experience as a Teacher", a genealogy of his family, a biography of Dr. Aaron Schuyler, and many articles on educational, mathematical and genealogical subjects.

He held that true teaching, worth-while education and right living consist in ethical and moral habit formation to control one's social contributions throughout life; and that service should guide one's action rather than profits.

At the time of his death he had a son, Elatus G. Loomis of Cleveland, Ohio, a daughter, Mrs. R. L. Lechner of Buenos Aires, and three grandchildren.
