= Frederick S. Woods =

Frederick Shenstone Woods (1864–1950) was an American mathematician.

He was a part of the mathematics faculty of the Massachusetts Institute of Technology from 1895 to 1934, being head of the department of mathematics from 1930 to 1934 and chairman of the MIT faculty from 1931 to 1933.

His textbook on analytic geometry in 1897 was reviewed by Maxime Bôcher.

In 1901 he wrote on Riemannian geometry and curvature of Riemannian manifolds. In 1903 he spoke on non-Euclidean geometry.

== Works ==
- 1901: Woods, F. S. (1901). "Space of constant curvature". The Annals of Mathematics. 3 (1/4): 71–112. doi:10.2307/1967636. JSTOR 1967636.
- 1905: Woods, F. S. (1905) [1903]. "Forms of non-Euclidean space". The Boston Colloquium: Lectures on Mathematics for the Year 1903: 31–74.
- 1907: (with Frederick H. Bailey) A Course in Mathematics via Internet Archive
- 1917: (with Frederick H. Bailey) Analytic Geometry and Calculus via Internet Archive
- 1922: (with Frederick H. Bailey) Elementary Calculus via Internet Archive
- 1922: Higher Geometry, Ginn and Company
- 1926: Advanced Calculus: A Course Arranged With Special Reference To The Needs Of Students Of Applied Mathematics, Ginn and Company

== Non-Euclidean geometry ==
Following Wilhelm Killing (1885) and others, Woods described motions in spaces of non-Euclidean geometry in the form:

$$x_{1}^{\prime}=x_{1}\cos kl+x_{0}\frac{\sin kl}{k},\quad x_{2}^{\prime}=x_{2},\quad x_{2}^{\prime}=x_{3},\quad x_{0}^{\prime}=-x_{1}k\sin kl+x_{0}\cos kl$$

which becomes a Lorentz boost by setting $k^{2}=-1$, as well as general motions in hyperbolic space
