= Aaron Galuten =

American mathematician and publisher

Aaron Galuten (March 2, 1917–September 23, 1994) was an American mathematician, known mainly as the founder and principal operator of the Chelsea Publishing Company.
