= William Fogg Osgood =

American mathematician

- Born: March 10, 1864; Boston, Massachusetts
- Died: July 22, 1943 (aged 79); Belmont, Massachusetts
- Resting place: Forest Hills Cemetery, Boston
- Education: Harvard University, University of Göttingen, Friedrich-Alexander-University, Erlangen-Nuremberg
- Known for: Complex analysis, conformal mapping, calculus of variations
- Spouse(s): Teresa Osgood, Celeste Phelpes Morse
- Children: 3
- Scientific career
- Fields: Mathematics
- Workplaces: Harvard University, Friedrich-Alexander-University, Erlangen-Nuremberg
- Doctoral advisor: Max Noether
- Doctoral students: David Raymond Curtiss

William Fogg Osgood (March 10, 1864 – July 22, 1943) was an American mathematician.

== Education and career ==
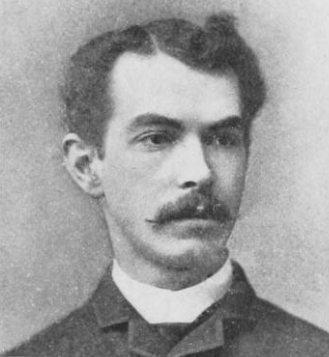
Osgood at Harvard, c. 1886

William Fogg Osgood was born in Boston on March 10, 1864. In 1886, he graduated from Harvard, where, after studying at the universities of Göttingen (1887–1889) and Erlangen (Ph.D., 1890), he was instructor (1890–1893), assistant professor (1893–1903), and thenceforth professor of mathematics. From 1918 to 1922, he was chairman of the department of mathematics at Harvard. He became professor emeritus in 1933. From 1934 to 1936, he was visiting professor of mathematics at Peking University.

From 1899 to 1902, he served as editor of the Annals of Mathematics, and in 1905–1906 was president of the American Mathematical Society, whose Transactions he edited in 1909–1910.

== Contributions ==
The works of Osgood dealt with complex analysis, in particular conformal mapping and uniformization of analytic functions, and calculus of variations. He was invited by Felix Klein to write an article on complex analysis in the Enzyklopädie der mathematischen Wissenschaften, which was later expanded in the book Lehrbuch der Funktionentheorie.

Osgood curves – Jordan curves with positive area – are named after Osgood, who published a paper proving their existence in 1903.

Besides his research on analysis, Osgood was also interested in mathematical physics and wrote on the theory of the gyroscope.

== Awards and honors ==
Osgood was elected to the American Academy of Arts and Sciences in 1899. In 1904, he was elected to the National Academy of Sciences. He was elected to the American Philosophical Society in 1915.

== Personal life ==
Osgood's cousin, Louise Osgood, was the mother of Bernard Koopman.

William Fogg Osgood died at his home in Belmont, Massachusetts on July 22, 1943.

== Selected publications ==
Osgood's books include:

- Introduction to Infinite Series (Harvard University Press 1897; third edition, 1906)
- Lehrbuch der Funktionentheorie (Teubner, Berlin, 1907; second edition, 1912)
- First Course in Differential and Integral Calculus (1907; revised edition, 1909)
- (with W. C. Graustein) Plane and Solid Analytic Geometry (Macmillan, NY, 1921)
- Elementary Calculus (MacMillan, NY, 1921)
- Advanced Calculus (MacMillan, NY, 1925)
- Mechanics (MacMillan, NY, 1937)

== See also ==
- Riemann mapping theorem
- Osgood's lemma
- Osgood–Brown theorem
- Moore–Osgood theorem
- Stieltjes–Osgood theorem
