= Michael Antonio Savageau =

Biologist (b. 1940)

Michael A. Savageau
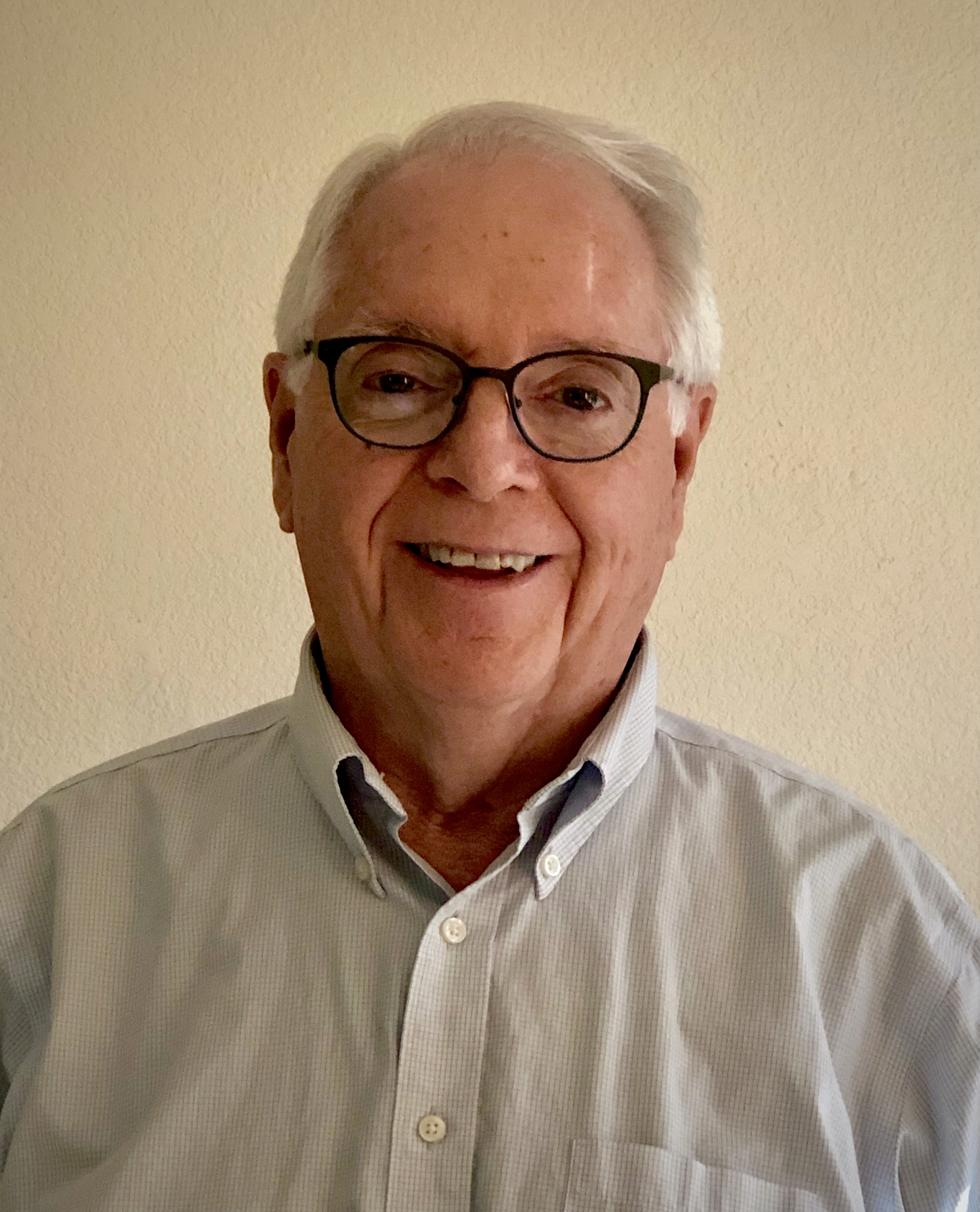
- Born: December 3, 1940 (age 85); Fargo, North Dakota, U.S.
- Education: University of Minnesota (BS), University of Iowa (M.S), Stanford University (PhD)
- Known for: Biochemical Systems Theory, Mathematically Controlled Comparison, Design Space Approach, Phenotype-centric Modeling
- Scientific career
- Institutions: University of California, Davis
- Doctoral advisor: R.D. Smallwood
- Website: savageaulab.bme.ucdavis.edu

Michael A. Savageau (born 3 December 1940) is a distinguished professor in the departments of microbiology & molecular genetics and biomedical engineering at the University of California, Davis. He was named Fellow of the Institute of Electrical and Electronics Engineers (IEEE) in 2013 for application of systems engineering concepts to molecular biology.

== Early life and education ==
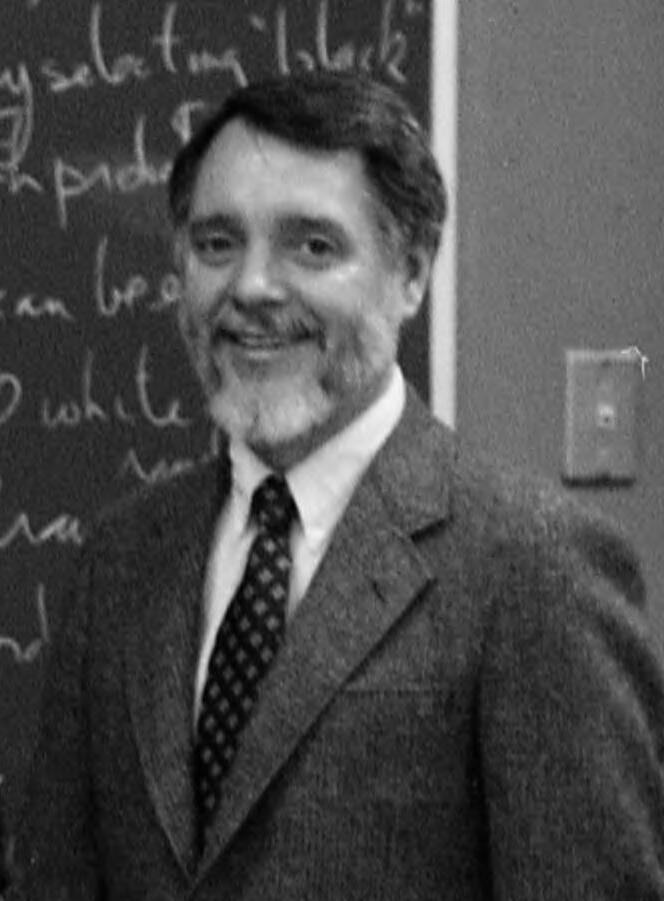
Savageau at the University of Michigan

Michael Antonio Savageau one of seven children, was born in Fargo, North Dakota on December 3, 1940. His father was a barber and his mother was a schoolteacher. He was an avid hockey and tennis player through high school, and he has credited sports with teaching him valuable life and professional skills. He struggled with undiagnosed dyslexia throughout his entire academic career, but he developed compensatory strategies. For example, he was unable to take notes in lecture classes, so he developed formidable concentration and memory skills. His dyslexia sparked his interest in mathematics and he excelled in those classes. Savageau graduated from Fargo Central High School in 1958 and went on to earn his Bachelor of Science degree in engineering from the University of Minnesota in 1962, and a Master of Science degree from the University of Iowa in 1963. He was accepted into the Ph.D. program in Electrical Engineering at Stanford University in 1963, and it was there that he began to develop his interest in applying engineering principles and methodologies to biological systems. Savageau was a postdoctoral fellow at both The University of California, Los Angeles (1967 - 1968, in the laboratory of Prof. Isaac Harary) and Stanford University (1968 - 1970, in the laboratory of Prof. J.P. Steward) prior to joining the faculty at The University of Michigan in 1970. He initiated Michigan's interdisciplinary training program in Cellular Biotechnology and its interdisciplinary Bioinformatics Program. He also chaired the Department of Microbiology & Immunology from 1979 to 1985 and from 1992 to 2002 and was named the Nicolas Rashevsky Distinguished University Professor in 2002. After moving to the University of California, Davis in 2003 he chaired the Department of Biomedical Engineering from 2005 to 2008.

== Personal life ==
Savageau met fellow student Ann Birky, (currently Ann Savageau, an artist and professor of art and design), at Stanford and they were married in 1967. They raised their family in Ann Arbor, Michigan, where both of them held faculty positions at The University of Michigan. They had three children, Mark, Patrick and Elisa, all of whom have preceded them in death. They are helping to raise their grandchildren in Davis, California.

== Awards and honors ==
Dr. Savageau's honors include Guggenheim Fellow, Fulbright Senior Research Fellow, Michigan Society of Fellows, American Academy of Microbiology Fellow, Foundation for Microbiology Lecturer, American Association for the Advancement of Science Fellow, American Institute for Medical and Biological Engineering Fellow, Institute of Electrical and Electronics Engineers Fellow, Moore Distinguished Scholar at the California Institute of Technology, Institut des Hautes Études Scientifiques Award, 79th Josiah Willard Gibbs Lecturer for the American Mathematical Society, Stanislaw Ulam Distinguished Scholar Award from the Center for Non-Linear Studies, Los Alamos National Laboratory, Member of the US National Academy of Medicine, Honorary Doctor of Science, Universitat de Lleida, Spain, The Michael A. Savageau Collegiate Professorship in Computational Medicine and Bioinformatics permanently endowed by the University of Michigan, the Akira Okubo Prize, and the establishment of the Michael A. Savageau Department Chair in Computational Medicine and Bioinformatics at the University of Michigan.

== Selected publications ==
Dr. Savageau's scientific career includes one book and over 170 peer-reviewed scientific publications, which cover diverse mathematical and biological questions. Below are listed some of his key publications, sorted by topic.

Biochemical Systems Theory

- Savageau, M.A. (1969). Biochemical systems analysis: I. Some mathematical properties of the rate law for the component enzymatic reactions. J. Theor. Biol. 25, 365–369.
- Savageau, M.A. (1969). Biochemical systems analysis: II. The steady-state solutions for an n- pool system using a power-law approximation. J. Theor. Biol. 25, 370–379.
- Savageau, M.A. (1970). Biochemical systems analysis: III. Dynamic solutions using a power-law approximation. J. Theor. Biol. 26, 215–226.
- Savageau, M.A., Voit, E.O. (1987). Recasting nonlinear differential equations as S-systems: a canonical nonlinear form. Math. Biosci. 87, 83–115.
- Savageau, M.A. (1971). Parameter sensitivity as a criterion for evaluating and comparing the performance of biochemical systems. Nature 229, 542–544.

Gene Circuits & Design Principles

- Savageau. M.A. (1974). Comparison of classical and autogenous systems of regulation in inducible operons. Nature 252, 546–549.
- Hlavacek, W.S., Savageau, M.A. (1996). Rules for coupled expression of regulator and effector genes in inducible circuits. J. Mol. Biol. 255, 121–139.
- Savageau, M.A. (2001). Design principles for elementary gene circuits: Elements, methods, and examples. Chaos 11, 142–159.
- Atkinson, M.R., Savageau, M.A., Myers, J.T., Ninfa, A.J. (2003). Development of genetic circuitry exhibiting toggle switch or oscillatory behavior in Escherichia coli. Cell 113, 597–607.
- Wall, M.E., Hlavacek, W.S., Savageau, M.A. (2004). Design of gene circuits: lessons from bacteria. Nat. Rev. Genet. 5, 34–42.

Method of Mathematically Controlled Comparison

- Savageau, M.A (1972). The behavior of intact biochemical control systems. Curr. Top. Cell. Reg. 6, 63–130.
- Savageau, M.A. (1974). Optimal design of feedback control by inhibition: steady-state considerations. J. Mol. Evol., 4, 139–156.
- Irvine, D.H. and Savageau, M.A. (1985). Network regulation of the immune response: alternative control points for suppressor modulation of effector lymphocytes. J. Immunol., 134, 2100– 2116.
- Hlavacek, W.S. and Savageau, M.A. (1996) Rules for coupled expression of regulator and effector genes in inducible circuits. J. Mol. Biol. 255, 121–139.
- Alves, R., Savageau, M.A. (2000). Extending the method of mathematically controlled comparison to include numerical comparisons. Bioinformatics 16, 786–798.

Design Space Approach, Design Space Toolbox, and Phenotype-centric Modeling Strategy

- Savageau, M.A., Coelho, P.M.B.M., Fasani, R.A., Tolla, D.A., Salvador, A. (2009). Phenotypes and tolerances in the design space of biochemical systems. PNAS 106, 6435–6440.
- Fasani, R.A., Savageau, M.A. (2010). Automated construction and analysis of the design space for biochemical systems. Bioinformatics 26, 2601–2609.
- Lomnitz, J.G., Savageau, M.A. (2016). Design Space Toolbox V2: automated software enabling a novel phenotype-centric modeling strategy for natural and synthetic biological systems. Front. Genet. 7, 118.
- Valderrama-Gómez, M.A., Parales, R.E., Savageau, M.A. (2018). Phenotype-centric modeling for elucidation of biological design principles. J. Theor. Biol. 455, 281–292.
- Valderrama-Gómez, M.A, Lomnitz, J.G., Fasani, RA, Savageau, M.A. (2020). Mechanistic modeling of biochemical systems without a priori parameter values using the Design Space Toolbox v. 3.0. iScience 101200.

Books

- Biochemical Systems Analysis: A Study of Function and Design in Molecular Biology, Addison-Wesley 1976.
