= Thomas Fiske =

American mathematician (1865–1944)

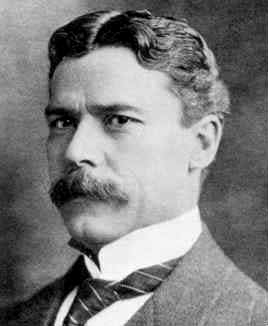
- Fiske between circa 1903 and circa 1904
- Born: December 5, 1865; New York City, New York, US
- Died: January 10, 1944 (aged 78)
- Education: Columbia University (PhD)
- Known for: Complex analysis
- Scientific career
- Fields: Mathematics
- Workplaces: Columbia University; Barnard College; American Mathematical Society (President 1903–04)

Thomas Scott Fiske (December 5, 1865–January 10, 1944) was an American mathematician.

He was born in New York City and graduated in 1885 (Ph.D., 1888) from Columbia University, where he was a fellow, assistant, tutor, instructor, and adjunct professor until 1897, when he became professor of mathematics. In 1899 he was acting dean of Barnard College. He was president in 1902–04 of the American Mathematical Society, and he also edited the Bulletin (1891–99) and Transactions (1899–1905) of this society. In 1902 he became secretary of the College Entrance Examination Board. In 1905–06 he also served as president of the Association of Teachers of Mathematics of the Middle States and Maryland. Besides his mathematical papers, he was author of Theory of Functions of a Complex Variable (1906; fourth edition, 1907)

== Writings ==
- Functions of a complex variable (New York: J. Wiley, 1907)
