= Notices of the American Mathematical Society =

Membership mathematics journal

- March 2005 issue
- Discipline: Mathematics
- Language: English
- Edited by: Mark C. Wilson

Publication details
- History: 1953–present
- Publisher: American Mathematical Society (United States)
- Frequency: Monthly, except combined June/July issue

Standard abbreviations
- ISO 4: Not. Am. Math. Soc.
- MathSciNet: Notices Amer. Math. Soc.

Indexing
- ISSN: 0002-9920 (print); 1088-9477 (web)

Links
- Journal homepage

The Notices of the American Mathematical Society is the membership journal of the American Mathematical Society (AMS), published monthly except for a combined June/July issue. Founded in 1953, it serves as the official magazine of record for the society and is distributed to approximately 30,000 AMS members worldwide, one-third of whom reside outside the United States. The AMS describes the Notices as one of "the world's most widely read journal aimed at professional mathematicians".

== Content ==
Each issue of the Notices contains one or two expository articles describing current developments in mathematical research, written by professional mathematicians. The journal also carries articles on the history of mathematics, mathematics education, and professional issues facing mathematicians, along with reviews of books, plays, movies, and other artistic and cultural works involving mathematics. Regular columns include Math Reviews News, Washington Update on policy matters affecting mathematicians, and Short Stories exploring lesser-known mathematical results. The Early Career section provides advice to graduate students, postdocs, and junior mathematicians.

Articles are peer reviewed by an editorial board of mathematical experts. The cover regularly features mathematical visualizations. Each issue since January 1995 is available in its entirety on the journal's website.

== Editors ==
The current editor-in-chief, Mark C. Wilson, began his term with the January 2025 issue. He succeeded Erica Flapan, who served as editor from 2019 to 2024. Previous editors include Frank Morgan (2003–2018).

== See also ==
- American Mathematical Monthly, another widely read mathematics journal
- Bulletin of the American Mathematical Society
