= Bulletin of the American Mathematical Society =

- October 2010 issue
- Discipline: Mathematics
- Language: English
- Edited by: Susan Friedlander

Publication details
- Former name: Bulletin of the New York Mathematical Society
- Publisher: American Mathematical Society (USA)
- Frequency: Quarterly
- Impact factor: 1.342 (2018)

Standard abbreviations
- ISO 4: Bull. Am. Math. Soc.
- MathSciNet: Bull. Amer. Math. Soc.

Indexing
- CODEN: BAMOAD
- ISSN: 0273-0979 (print); 1088-9485 (web)

Links
- Journal homepage; Bulletin of the AMS

The Bulletin of the American Mathematical Society is a quarterly mathematical journal published by the American Mathematical Society.

== Scope ==
It publishes surveys on contemporary research topics, written at a level accessible to non-experts. It also publishes, by invitation only, book reviews and short Mathematical Perspectives articles.

== History ==
It began as the Bulletin of the New York Mathematical Society and underwent a name change when the society became national. The Bulletin's function has changed over the years; its original function was to serve as a research journal for its members.

== Indexing ==
The Bulletin is indexed in Mathematical Reviews, Science Citation Index, ISI Alerting Services, CompuMath Citation Index, and Current Contents/Physical, Chemical & Earth Sciences.

== See also ==
- Journal of the American Mathematical Society
- Memoirs of the American Mathematical Society
- Notices of the American Mathematical Society
- Proceedings of the American Mathematical Society
- Transactions of the American Mathematical Society
