= American Mathematical Society =

Association of professional mathematicians

Coordinates: 41.8372°N 71.4123°W

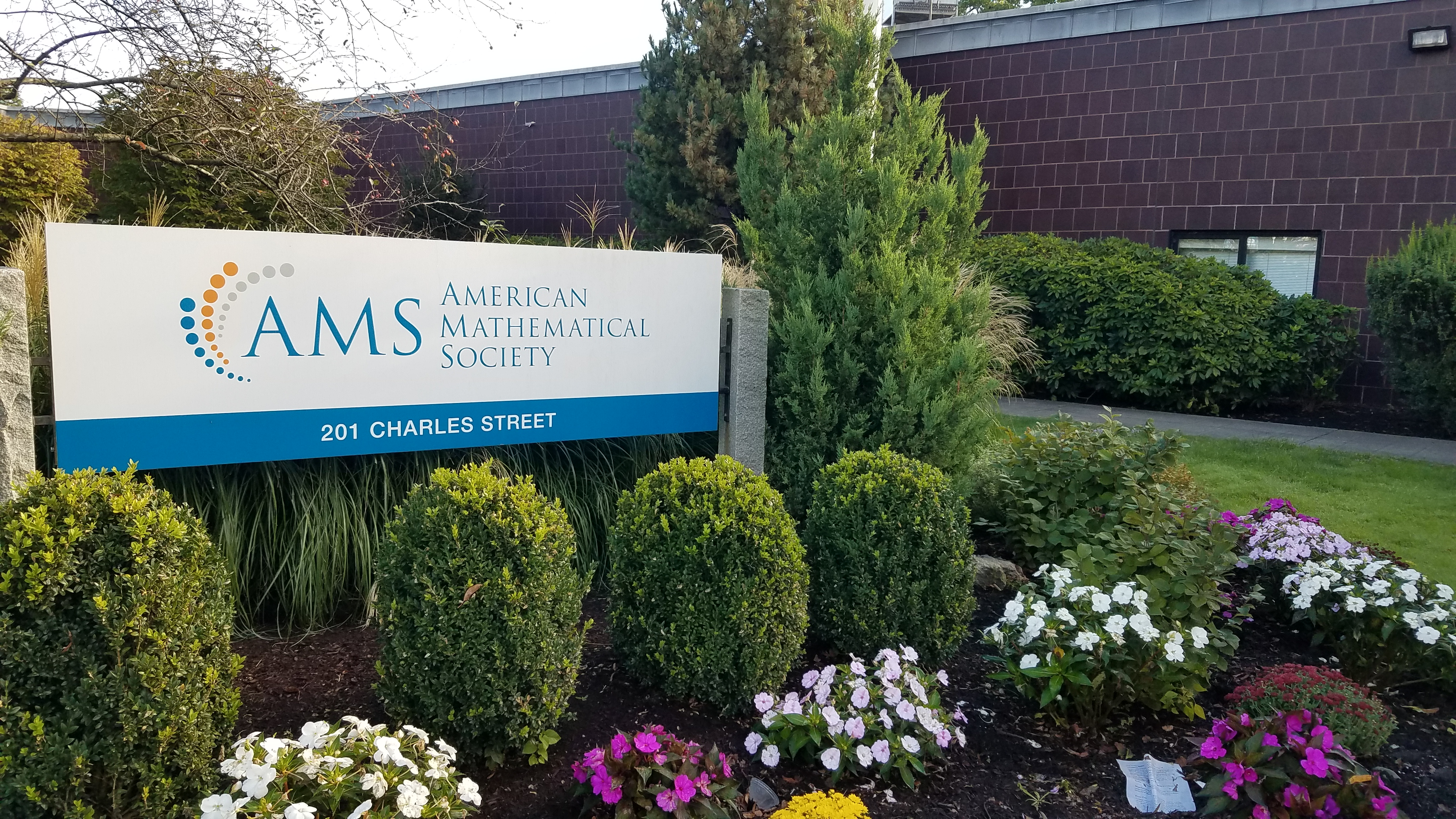
- Formation: 1888; 138 years ago
- Tax ID no.: 05-0264797
- Legal status: 501(c)(3) non-profit
- Headquarters: Providence, Rhode Island
- Members: 30,000
- President: Ravi Vakil
- Chief executive officer: John Meier
- Subsidiaries: AMS Chelsea Publishing
- Revenue: $43,535,301 (2024)
- Website: www.ams.org

The American Mathematical Society (AMS) is an association of professional mathematicians dedicated to the interests of mathematical research and scholarship, and serves the national and international community through its publications, meetings, advocacy and other programs.

The society is one of the four parts of the Joint Policy Board for Mathematics and a member of the Conference Board of the Mathematical Sciences.

== History ==
The AMS was founded in 1888 as the New York Mathematical Society, the brainchild of Thomas Fiske, who was impressed by the London Mathematical Society on a visit to England. John Howard Van Amringe became the first president while Fiske became secretary. The society soon decided to publish a journal, but ran into some resistance over concerns about competing with the American Journal of Mathematics. The result was the Bulletin of the American Mathematical Society, with Fiske as editor-in-chief. The de facto journal, as intended, was influential in increasing membership. The popularity of the Bulletin soon led to the launches of the Transactions of the American Mathematical Society and Proceedings of the American Mathematical Society, which were also de facto journals.

In 1891, Charlotte Scott of Britain became the first woman to join the AMS, then called the New York Mathematical Society. The society reorganized under its present name (American Mathematical Society) and became a national society in 1894, and that year Scott became the first woman on the first council of the society. In 1927 Anna Pell-Wheeler became the first woman to present a lecture at the society's colloquium.

In 1951 there was a southeastern sectional meeting of the Mathematical Association of America in Nashville. The citation delivered at the 2007 MAA awards presentation, where Lee Lorch received a standing ovation, recorded that:

Lee Lorch, the chair of the mathematics department at Fisk University, and three Black colleagues, Evelyn Boyd (now Granville), Walter Brown, and H. M. Holloway came to the meeting and were able to attend the scientific sessions. However, the organizer for the closing banquet refused to honor the reservations of these four mathematicians. (Letters in Science, August 10, 1951, pp. 161–162 spell out the details.) Lorch and his colleagues wrote to the governing bodies of the AMS [American Mathematical Society] and MAA seeking bylaws against discrimination. Bylaws were not changed, but non-discriminatory policies were established and have been strictly observed since then.

Also in 1951, the American Mathematical Society's headquarters moved from New York City to Providence, Rhode Island. The society later added an office in Ann Arbor, Michigan, in 1965 and an office in Washington, D.C., in 1992.

In 1954 the society called for the creation of a new teaching degree, a Doctor of Arts in Mathematics, similar to a PhD but without a research thesis.

In the 1970s, as reported in "A Brief History of the Association for Women in Mathematics: The Presidents' Perspectives" by Lenore Blum:

In those years the AMS was governed by what could only be called an "old boys network", closed to all but those in the inner circle. Mary [W. Gray] challenged that by sitting in on the council meeting in Atlantic City. When she was told she had to leave, she refused saying she would wait until the police came. (Mary relates the story somewhat differently: when she was told she had to leave, she responded she could find no rules in the by-laws restricting attendance at council meetings. She was then told it was by "gentlemen's agreement". Naturally Mary replied "Well, obviously I'm no gentleman.") After that time, council meetings were open to observers and the process of democratization of the society had begun.

Also, in 1971 the AMS established its Joint Committee on Women in the Mathematical Sciences (JCW), which later became a joint committee of multiple scholarly societies.

Julia Robinson was the first female president of the American Mathematical Society (1983–1984), but was unable to complete her term as she was suffering from leukemia.

In 1988, the Journal of the American Mathematical Society was created, as the flagship journal of the AMS.

== AMS and mathematical research ==
The American Mathematical Society plays a significant role in advancing mathematical research by fostering collaboration, supporting early-career researchers, and maintaining influential publications and databases.

=== Research collaborations and support ===
The AMS facilitates collaboration among mathematicians through a variety of programs aimed at different career stages. The Mathematical Research Communities, established in 2008, provides early-career researchers with opportunities to engage in intensive research workshops, collaborate with peers, and receive mentoring from senior mathematicians. These programs often lead to the formation of long-term research groups that contribute to emerging fields in mathematics.

In addition, the AMS supports Research Experiences for Undergraduates through advocacy and funding partnerships, ensuring that undergraduate students are exposed to high-level mathematical research. The AMS also offers travel grants and fellowships to encourage participation in international conferences and collaborative research projects.

=== Imprints ===
Chelsea Publishing Company was acquired in 1997 and continues to publish a portion of the company's original catalog under AMS Chelsea Publishing. AMS Chelsea Publishing also publishes new titles.

== Influence on policy and education ==
=== Advocacy for mathematics funding ===
The AMS advocates for federal funding for mathematical research. It collaborates with organizations such as the National Science Foundation and the National Academy of Sciences to promote funding initiatives. The AMS is also a member of the Joint Policy Board for Mathematics, which works with policymakers to emphasize the role of mathematics in technological advancements and national security.

In partnership with the American Association for the Advancement of Science, the AMS has contributed to discussions on STEM workforce development and the applications of mathematics in areas such as cybersecurity and data science. The society has supported initiatives for stable funding in mathematical research, citing its importance in economic growth and scientific development.

== Meetings ==
The AMS, along with more than a dozen other organizations, holds the largest annual research mathematics meeting in the world, the Joint Mathematics Meeting, in early January. The 2019 Joint Mathematics Meeting in Baltimore drew approximately 6,000 attendees. Each of the four regional sections of the AMS (Central, Eastern, Southeastern, and Western) holds meetings in the spring and fall of each year. The society also co-sponsors meetings with other international mathematical societies.

== Fellows ==
The AMS selects an annual class of fellows who have made outstanding contributions to the advancement of mathematics.

== Publications ==
The AMS publishes Mathematical Reviews, a database of reviews of mathematical publications, various journals, and books, and maintains the associated online version MathSciNet. In 1997 the AMS acquired Chelsea Publishing Company, which it uses as an imprint. In 2017, the AMS acquired MAA Press, the book publishing program of the Mathematical Association of America. The AMS has continued to publish books under the MAA Press imprint.

=== Journals ===
Journal Kind	Journal Name	Publication Period		Publication Model or Access
Journal Kind	Journal Name	Print	Online	Publication Model or Access
General topics	Bulletin of the American Mathematical Society	Quarterly	Anytime	Membership Subscription
General topics	Communications of the American Mathematical Society	Not applicable	Anytime	Diamond open access
General topics	Electronic Research Announcements of the American Mathematical Society	Not applicable	Anytime	
General topics	Journal of the American Mathematical Society	Quarterly		Green open access
General topics	Memoirs of the American Mathematical Society	Monthly		Green open access
General topics	Notices of the American Mathematical Society	Monthly		Membership Subscription (freely viewable online)
General topics	Proceedings of the American Mathematical Society	Monthly	Anytime	Green open access
General topics	Proceedings of the American Mathematical Society Series B	Not applicable	Anytime	Gold open access
General topics	Transactions of the American Mathematical Society	Monthly	Anytime	Green open access
General topics	Transactions of the American Mathematical Society Series B	Not applicable	Anytime	Gold open access
Specific topics	Conformal Geometry and Dynamics	Not applicable	Anytime	Diamond open access
Specific topics	Journal of Algebraic Geometry	Quarterly		
Specific topics	Mathematics of Computation	Bimonthly	Anytime	Green open access
Specific topics	Mathematical Surveys and Monographs	Anytime		
Specific topics	Representation Theory	Not applicable	Anytime	Diamond open access
Specific topics	Theory of Probability and Mathematical Statistics	Biannually	Biannually	
Translations	St. Petersburg Mathematical Journal	Bimonthly	Bimonthly	(freely viewable online)
Translations	Transactions of the Moscow Mathematical Society	Annually	Annually	(freely viewable online)
Translations	Sugaku Expositions	Biennially	Biennially	(freely viewable online)

=== Proceedings and collections ===
- Advances in Soviet Mathematics
- American Mathematical Society Translations
- AMS/IP Studies in Advanced Mathematics
- Centre de Recherches Mathématiques (CRM) Proceedings & Lecture Notes
- Contemporary Mathematics
- IMACS: Series in Discrete Mathematics and Theoretical Computer Science
- Fields Institute Communications
- Proceedings of Symposia in Applied Mathematics
- Proceedings of Symposia in Pure Mathematics

== Prizes ==
Some prizes are awarded jointly with other mathematical organizations. See specific articles for details.

- Bôcher Memorial Prize
- Cole Prize
- David P. Robbins Prize
- Fulkerson Prize
- Leroy P. Steele Prizes
- Morgan Prize
- Norbert Wiener Prize in Applied Mathematics
- Oswald Veblen Prize in Geometry

== Presidents ==
The AMS is led by the president, who is elected for a two-year term, and cannot serve for two consecutive terms. The current president is Ravi Vakil, who took office in February 2025.

=== 1888–1900 ===
- John Howard Van Amringe (New York Mathematical Society) (1888–1890)
- Emory McClintock (New York Mathematical Society) (1891–94)
- George Hill (1895–96)
- Simon Newcomb (1897–98)
- Robert Woodward (1899–1900)

=== 1901–1950 ===
- Eliakim Moore (1901–02)
- Thomas Fiske (1903–04)
- William Osgood (1905–06)
- Henry White (1907–08)
- Maxime Bôcher (1909–10)
- Henry Fine (1911–12)
- Edward Van Vleck (1913–14)
- Ernest Brown (1915–16)
- Leonard Dickson (1917–18)
- Frank Morley (1919–20)
- Gilbert Bliss (1921–22)
- Oswald Veblen (1923–24)
- George Birkhoff (1925–26)
- Virgil Snyder (1927–28)
- Earle Raymond Hedrick (1929–30)
- Luther Eisenhart (1931–32)
- Arthur Byron Coble (1933–34)
- Solomon Lefschetz (1935–36)
- Robert Moore (1937–38)
- Griffith C. Evans (1939–40)
- Marston Morse (1941–42)
- Marshall Stone (1943–44)
- Theophil Hildebrandt (1945–46)
- Einar Hille (1947–48)
- Joseph L. Walsh (1949–50)

=== 1951–2000 ===
- John von Neumann (1951–52)
- Gordon Whyburn (1953–54)
- Raymond Wilder (1955–56)
- Richard Brauer (1957–58)
- Edward McShane (1959–60)
- Deane Montgomery (1961–62)
- Joseph Doob (1963–64)
- Abraham Albert (1965–66)
- Charles B. Morrey Jr. (1967–68)
- Oscar Zariski (1969–70)
- Nathan Jacobson (1971–72)
- Saunders Mac Lane (1973–74)
- Lipman Bers (1975–76)
- R. H. Bing (1977–78)
- Peter Lax (1979–80)
- Andrew Gleason (1981–82)
- Julia Robinson (1983–84)
- Irving Kaplansky (1985–86)
- George Mostow (1987–88)
- William Browder (1989–90)
- Michael Artin (1991–92)
- Ronald Graham (1993–94)
- Cathleen Morawetz (1995–96)
- Arthur Jaffe (1997–98)
- Felix Browder (1999–2000)

=== 2001–present ===
- Hyman Bass (2001–02)
- David Eisenbud (2003–04)
- James Arthur (2005–06)
- James Glimm (2007–08)
- George E. Andrews (2009–10)
- Eric M. Friedlander (2011–12)
- David Vogan (2013–14)
- Robert L. Bryant (2015–16)
- Ken Ribet (2017–18)
- Jill Pipher (2019–20)
- Ruth Charney (2021–22)
- Bryna Kra (2023–24)
- Ravi Vakil (2025–present)

== Executive directors ==
The AMS has an executive director who sits at the helm of the organization, steering it, managing its operations, and carrying out its mission according to the strategic direction of the board of trustees.

- Holbrook MacNeille (1949–1954)
- John Curtiss (1954–1959)
- Gordon Walker (1959–1977)
- William LeVeque (1977–1988)
- William Jaco (1988–1995)
- John H. Ewing (1995–2009)
- Donald McClure (2009–2016)
- Catherine Roberts (2016–2023)
- John Meier (2024-)

== See also ==
- Canadian Mathematical Society
- Mathematical Association of America
- European Mathematical Society
- London Mathematical Society
- List of mathematical societies
