= Nellie Greenwood Andrews =

Canadian suffragist

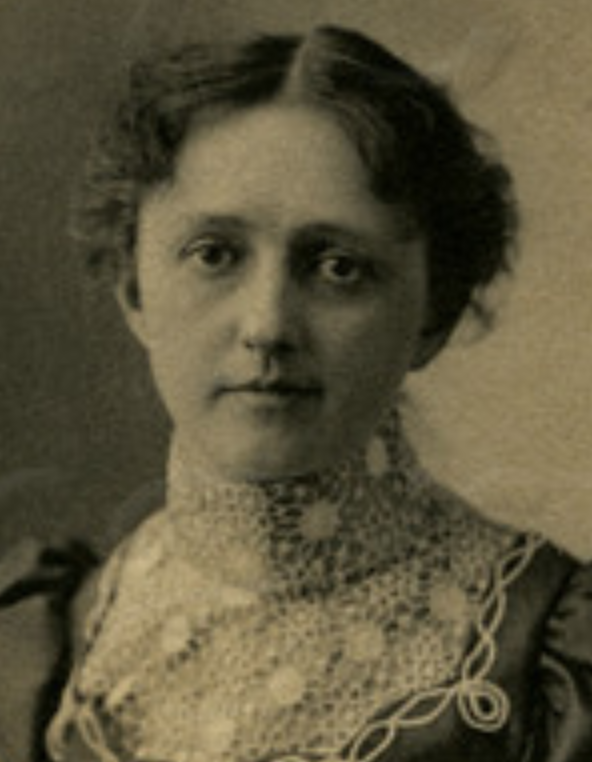
- Nellie Greenwood (later Andrews) in the 1880s
- Born: Nellie Cora Greenwood; April 21, 1864; Farmington, Maine, U.S.
- Died: February 19, 1958 (aged 93); Regina, Saskatchewan, Canada
- Other name: Mrs. W. W. Andrews
- Occupations: Educator, clubwoman

Nellie Cora Greenwood Andrews (April 21, 1864 – 1958) was an American-born Canadian educator, suffragist, temperance worker, and clubwoman. She was also the first woman student to enroll in Victoria College in Ontario, the third woman to graduate from college in Canada (after Grace Annie Lockhart in 1875 and Harriet Starr Stewart in 1882), and the first woman in Canada to earn a Bachelor of Science degree, in 1884.

== Early life and education ==
Nellie Cora Greenwood was born in Farmington, Maine, the daughter of Cyprian Stevens Greenwood and Esther Elizabeth Butterfield Greenwood. She graduated from Victoria College in Toronto in 1884, as the first woman student enrolled at the school, the second woman to graduate from a Canadian college, and the first woman in Canada to earn a Bachelor of Science degree. In 1910, she was a special guest for an event at Victoria College, marking the 30th anniversary of her admission, and thus of the admission of women to the school.

== Career ==
Greenwood was a schoolteacher before she married in 1887. She taught botany and drawing at Peterborough Collegiate Institute from 1892 to 1894, and she taught mathematics and astronomy at Mount Allison College in New Brunswick for two years.

Her husband became the first president of Regina College in 1911. From 1912 to 1917, Nellie Andrews was president of the Saskatchewan Women's Christian Temperance Union. She also worked for women's suffrage, as chair of the first Provincial Equal Franchise Board. She addressed the provincial legislature on suffrage in 1915. She was elected to the Regina Collegiate Board in 1921, and was founding president of the University Women's Club of Regina.

== Personal life ==
Greenwood married Wilbur William Andrews in 1887; they had three children, Mabel, Herbert, and Elizabeth. Her husband was a Methodist clergyman, professor, and agriculturist; he died in 1922. Andrews died in 1958, at the age of 93, in Regina. There is a manuscript of her reminiscences in the Victoria University Student Collection. In 1992, the Regina Plains Museum included Andrews among notable local women in a display for Canada 125.
