= Kempner number (disambiguation) =

Kempner number or Kempner numbers may refer to:

- The values of the Kempner function, the smallest positive integer m such that n divides m!.
- The Kempner number, a transcendental real number.
