= Walter Buckingham Carver =

American mathematician

- Born: January 11, 1879; Town Hill, Fulton County, Pennsylvania, U.S.
- Died: July 4, 1961 (aged 82); Ithaca, New York, U.S.
- Education: Gettysburg College (undergraduate), Dickinson College (graduated in 1899), Johns Hopkins University (Ph.D. in mathematics, 1904)
- Occupation: Mathematician
- Employer(s): Ursinus College (1904–1906), Cornell University (1906–1948)
- Known for: President of the Mathematical Association of America (1939–1940)
- Predecessor: Aubrey J. Kempner
- Successor: Raymond Woodard Brink
- Awards: Honorary doctorate from Dickinson College (1929)

Walter Buckingham Carver (January 11, 1879, Town Hill, Fulton County, Pennsylvania – July 4, 1961, Ithaca, New York) was an American mathematician, noteworthy as the president of the Mathematical Association of America for a two-year term in 1939 and 1940.

== Biography ==
Carver was an undergraduate at Gettysburg College and then at Dickinson College, where he graduated in 1899. In 1904 he received in his Ph.D. in mathematics from Johns Hopkins University. His thesis On the Cayley-Veronese Class of Configurations was supervised by Frank Morley. For two academic years from 1904 to 1906, Carver was a professor at Ursinus College. In 1906 joined the faculty of Cornell University and held a professorship there until he retired as professor emeritus in 1948. He dedicated his career to mathematics education, primarily of college undergraduates. He chaired Cornell's mathematics department from 1929 to 1932 and again from 1938 to 1940. In retirement he was active in mathematical teaching and problem solving until shortly before his death. His last article in the MAA's American Mathematical Monthly was published about a week before his death. At professor emeritus, he occasionally taught and counseled Cornell students and conducted summer sessions in mathematical programs.

Carver was a founding member in 1915 of the Mathematical Association of America (MAA) and the MAA's 18th president. As president, he was the successor to Aubrey J. Kempner and the predecessor of Raymond Woodard Brink. Carver was from 1943 to 1948 the MAA's secretary-treasurer, as the successor to Williams D. Cairns.

Carver served as the editor-in-chief of the American Mathematical Monthly for 4 years from 1932 to 1936. His contributions of problems and solutions to the American Mathematical Monthly spanned about 58 years, longer than any other contributor in his lifetime. In 1937 at the MAA's annual meeting, he gave an invited address Thinking versus manipulation, criticizing the teaching of formal manipulations without sufficient emphasis on mathematical reasoning.

In 1929 Dickinson College awarded him an honorary doctorate.

== Selected publications ==
=== Articles ===
- Carver, W.B. (1905). "On the Cayley-Veronese class of configurations" (PDF). Transactions of the American Mathematical Society. 6 (4): 534–545. doi:10.1090/S0002-9947-1905-1500727-X.
- Carver, W. B. (1911). "The Poles of Finite Groups of Fractional Linear Substitutions in the Complex Plane". The American Mathematical Monthly. 18 (2): 27–29. doi:10.1080/00029890.1911.11997595.
- Carver, Walter B. (1920). "The Failure of the Clifford Chain". American Journal of Mathematics. 42 (3): 137–167. doi:10.2307/2370427. JSTOR 2370427.
- Carver, Walter B. (1922). "Systems of Linear Inequalities". Annals of Mathematics. 23 (3): 212–220. doi:10.2307/1967919. JSTOR 1967919.
- Carver, Walter B. (1923). "The Mathematical Puzzle as a Stimulus to Investigation". The American Mathematical Monthly. 30 (3): 132–135. doi:10.1080/00029890.1923.11986217.
- Carver, W. B. (1941). "The Polygonal Regions into which a Plane is Divided by n Straight Lines". The American Mathematical Monthly. 48 (10): 667–675. doi:10.1080/00029890.1941.11991160.
- Carver, W. B. (1950). "The Problem of Eight Points". The American Mathematical Monthly. 57 (5): 307–316. doi:10.1080/00029890.1950.11999538.

=== Books ===
- Handbook of Formulas and Tables for Engineers (2nd, revised & enlarged ed.). McGraw-Hill. 1916; compiled by Clarence Andrew Peirce with mathematical sections by Walter B. Carver
