= Caddie Woodlawn (musical) =

Caddie Woodlawn a Musical Drama
- Author: Tom Shelton; Susan C. Hunter; Carol Ryrie Brink
- Cover artist: Bill Shackford
- Language: English
- Genre: Libretto
- Publisher: Samuel French Inc.
- Publication date: 2011
- Publication place: United States
- Media type: Print (paperback)
- Pages: 112
- ISBN: 978-0-573-69857-6

Caddie Woodlawn a Musical Drama is a musical based on the novel Caddie Woodlawn by Carol Ryrie Brink. The book, music and lyrics are by Tom Shelton and Susan C. Hunter.

In 1935 Carol Ryrie Brink wrote the Newbery Medal —winning novel,Caddie Woodlawn, based on the childhood of her grandmother, Caroline Woodhouse. She had collected the stories that her grandmother had often recounted of her adventures as a pioneer child settling the wilderness of western Wisconsin in the mid-1800s. It won the Newbery Medal in 1936.

In the musical, as in the original novel, Caddie, a high-spirited Wisconsin pioneer girl beloved by generations of readers, leads her willing siblings in a series of adventures, not always with the approval of her traditional Bostonian mother. Her father, however, encourages her antics, that she might thrive in the new, tougher ways of the west. In a climax, Caddie single-handedly diffuses a potentially deadly clash between the terrified settlers and the local Dakota tribe through a daring and dangerous act. But her action only deepens her conflict with her mother. Ultimately, Caddie learns invaluable lessons about reconciling the head-strong child she's been, and the responsible adult she is soon to be. Through it all, the sacredness of tradition—passed from one generation to the next—is powerfully dramatized. As one wise friend tells Caddie: "families -- they're our link to forever, lass."

== Background ==
Tom and Susan wrote the book, music and lyrics to Caddie Woodlawn, which won the Landers Theatre national playwriting award. Susan is the granddaughter of Carol Ryrie Brink, who in turn was granddaughter of the real-life Caddie. The authors use authentic Dakota language for the Native Americans in the story.

== Performances ==
- An article in the Los Angeles Times indicates a workshop production was performed at the Whittier, California Junior Theater in August 1986.
- According to Playwrights Database, the musical as it exists today was first performed March 22, 1992 at the Landers Theater, in Springfield, Missouri after winning a Springfield Little Theatre's national playwriting competition for new musicals, with support by the Missouri Arts council. It was directed by Mick Denniston and starred Danna Weddle as Caddie.
- The musical got its first professional (Actors' Equity Association) production at First Stage Milwaukee in 1996.
- The musical was produced in 2009 by the Red Cedar Youth Stage in Menomonie, Wisconsin. RCYS is part of the Menomonie Theater Guild (MTG), which performs in the Mabel Tainter Center for the Arts (Mabel Tainter Memorial Building). Menomonie is located just 12 miles from the real life location of the novel.
- The musical has been performed by a number of other community theaters around the country. (For information on various productions, see the musical's Facebook page )

== Cast ==
- Caddie Woodlawn – Redheaded scamp, reckless and brave, refuses to be "a lady," 13 years old, high-belt alto
- Robert Ireton – A cheery Irishman, taken to singing, dancing, and handing out good advice, bari-tenor
- Annabelle Gray– Cousin to the Woodlawns, a graduate of finishing school, finds Wisconsin "quaint and rustic," soprano
- John Woodlawn – Caddie's father, handsome and gentle, with quiet strength, baritone
- Harriet Woodlawn – Caddie's mother, refined, wants the same for her children, alto
- Tom Woodlawn – Caddie's mischievous older brother, full of fun and pranks, about 14 years old, boy tenor
- Warren Woodlawn – Caddie's younger brother, about 10, always trying to keep up with the other two, full of energy, strong child singer
- Reverend Tanner – The Circuit Rider, hails from Boston, high baritone

== Musical numbers ==
Act One

- Wisconsin Welcome - Company
- Wisconsin Anthem - Reverend and Company
- Graveside Hymn - Reverend, Mr. Woodlawn, Mrs Woodlawn and Company
- We Are We - Caddie, Tom, Warren
- Toms Tall Tale - Tom, Warren
- The Oath - Caddie, Tom, Warren
- Quaint and Rustic - Annabelle, Caddie, Tom, Warren

Act Two

- The City of Boston - Caddie, Mrs. Woodlawn
- Breeches and Clogs - Mr. Woodlawn
- Waiting - Company
- O'Grady's Fiddle - Paddy, Company
- A Change in the Wind - Paddy, Caddie
- Paddy's Lament - Paddy
- Epilogue - The Company

There is a Theatre for Young Audiences version that cuts several of the songs for an hour-long production.
