= Mathematical Association of America =

American organization that focuses on undergraduate-level mathematics

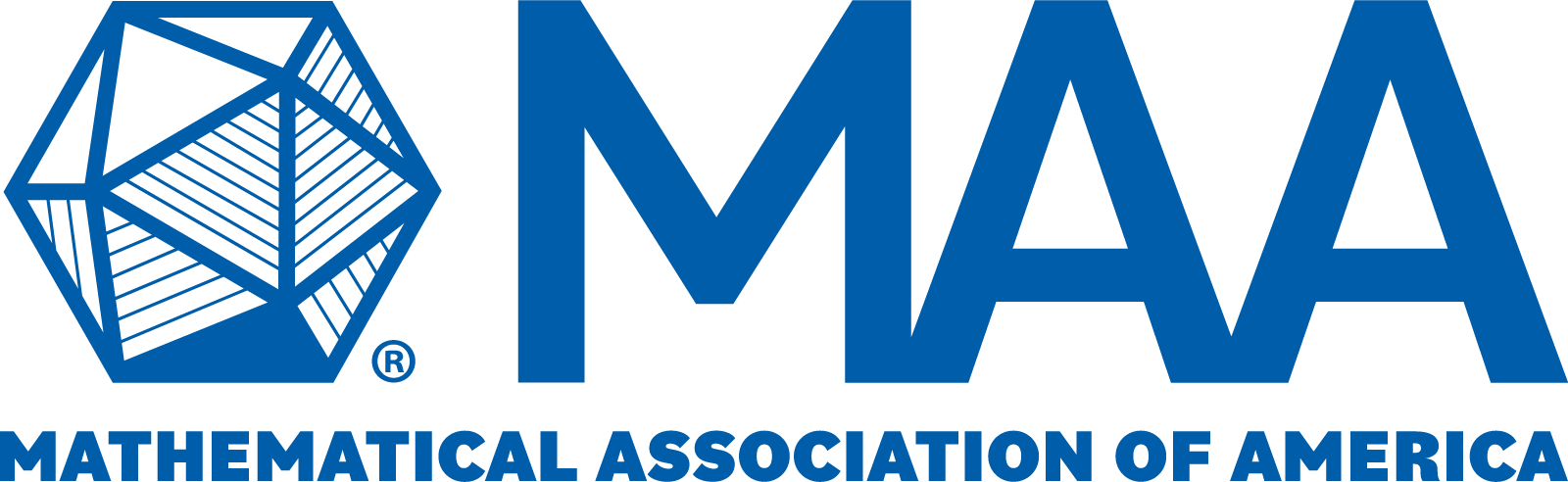

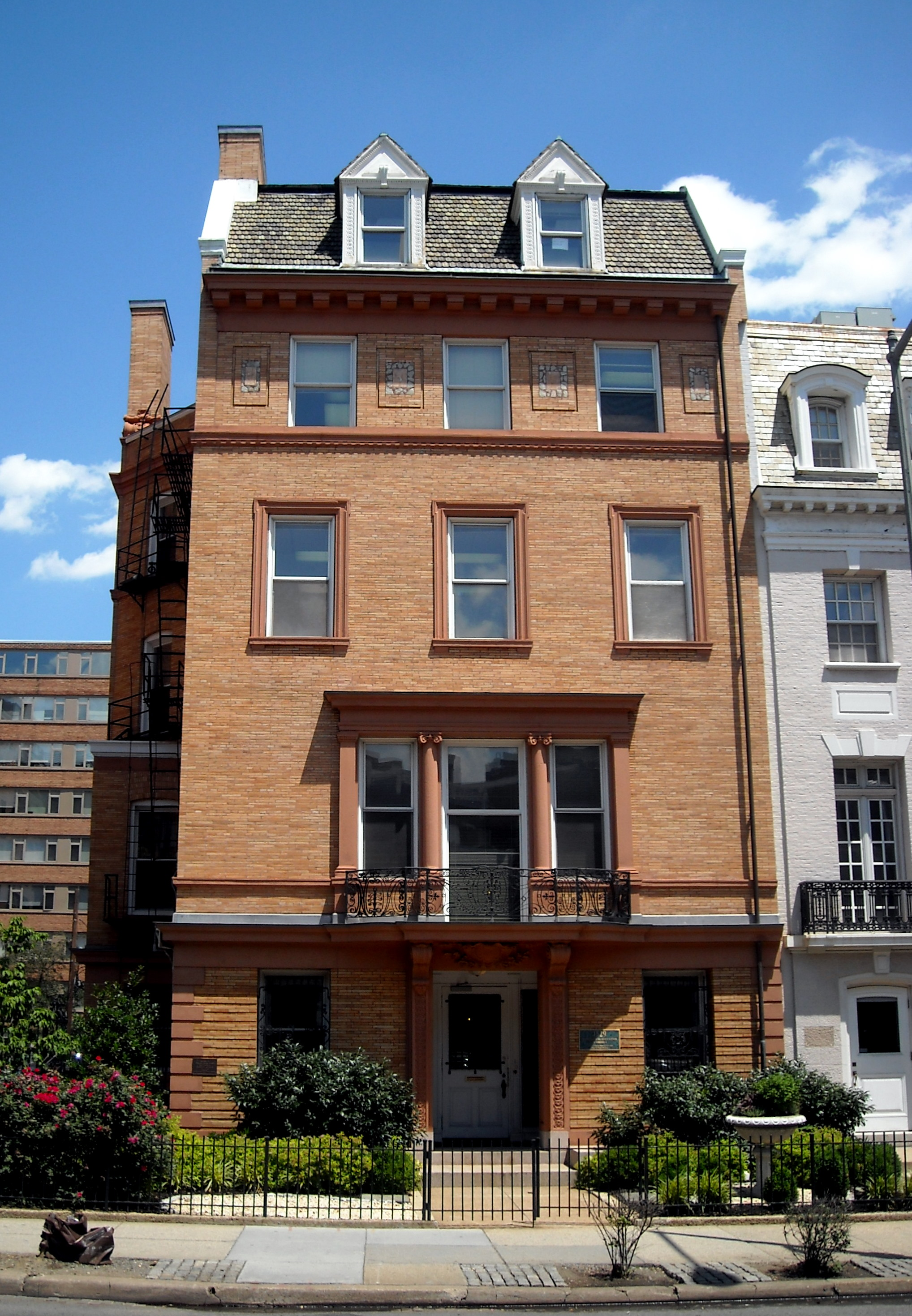
- Mathematical Association of America headquarters at 1529 18th Street NW.
- Formation: 1915
- Headquarters: 11 Dupont Cir NW Suite 200, Washington, DC 20036
- Members: 25,000+
- President: Jenna Carpenter
- Key people: Michael Pearson, Executive Director
- Website: www.maa.org

The Mathematical Association of America (MAA) is a professional society that focuses on mathematics accessible at the undergraduate level. Members include university, college, and high school teachers; graduate and undergraduate students; pure and applied mathematicians; computer scientists; statisticians; and many others in academia, government, business, and industry.

The MAA was founded in 1915 and is headquartered at 11 Dupont in the Dupont Circle neighborhood of Washington, D.C. The organization publishes mathematics journals and books, including the American Mathematical Monthly (established in 1894 by Benjamin Finkel), the most widely read mathematics journal in the world according to records on JSTOR.

== Meetings ==
The MAA sponsors the annual summer MathFest and cosponsors with the American Mathematical Society the Joint Mathematics Meeting, held in early January of each year. On occasion the Society for Industrial and Applied Mathematics joins in these meetings. Twenty-nine regional sections also hold regular meetings.

== Publications ==
The association publishes multiple journals in partnership with Taylor & Francis:

- The American Mathematical Monthly is expository, aimed at a broad audience from undergraduate students to research mathematicians.
- Mathematics Magazine is expository, aimed at teachers of undergraduate mathematics, especially at the junior-senior level.
- The College Mathematics Journal is expository, aimed at teachers of undergraduate mathematics, especially at the freshman-sophomore level.
- Math Horizons is expository, aimed at undergraduate students.

MAA FOCUS is the association member newsletter. The Association publishes an online resource, Mathematical Sciences Digital Library (Math DL). The service launched in 2001 with the online-only Journal of Online Mathematics and its Applications (JOMA) and a set of classroom tools, Digital Classroom Resources. These were followed in 2004 by Convergence, an online-only history magazine, and in 2005 by MAA Reviews, an online book review service, and Classroom Capsules and Notes, a set of classroom notes.

The MAA publishes several book series, aimed at a broad audience, but primarily for undergraduates majoring in mathematics. The series are: Anneli Lax New Mathematical Library, Carus Mathematical Monographs, Classroom Resource Materials, Dolciani Mathematical Expositions, MAA Notes, MAA Textbooks, Problem Books, and Spectrum.

== Competitions ==
The MAA sponsors numerous competitions for students, including the William Lowell Putnam Competition for undergraduate students, the online competition series, and the American Mathematics Competitions (AMC) for middle- and high-school students. This series of competitions is as follows:

- AMC 8: 25 multiple choice questions in 40 minutes
- AMC 10/AMC 12: 25 multiple choice questions in 75 minutes
- AIME: 15 short answer questions in a 3-hour period
- USAMO/USAJMO: 6 questions, 2 days, 9 hours, proof-based olympiad

Through this program, outstanding students are identified and invited to participate in the Mathematical Olympiad Program. Ultimately, six high school students are chosen to represent the U.S. at the International Mathematics Olympiad.

== Sections ==
The MAA is composed of the following twenty-nine regional sections:

Allegheny Mountain, EPADEL, Florida, Illinois, Indiana, Intermountain, Iowa, Kansas, Kentucky, Louisiana/Mississippi, MD-DC-VA, Metro New York, Michigan, Missouri, Nebraska – SE SD, New Jersey, North Central, Northeastern, Northern CA – NV-HI, Ohio, Oklahoma-Arkansas, Pacific Northwest, Rocky Mountain, Seaway, Southeastern, Southern CA – NV, Southwestern, Texas, Wisconsin

== Special Interest Groups ==
There are seventeen Special Interest Groups of the Mathematical Association of America (SIGMAAs). These SIGMAAs were established to advance the MAA mission by supporting groups with a common mathematical interest, and facilitating interaction between such groups and the greater mathematics community.

- Mathematics and the Arts
- Business, Industry, Government
- Mathematical and Computational Biology
- Environmental Mathematics
- History of Mathematics
- Inquiry-Based Learning
- Math Circles for Students and Teachers
- Mathematical Knowledge for Teaching
- Philosophy of Mathematics
- Quantitative Literacy
- Recreational Mathematics
- Research in Undergraduate Mathematics Education
- Mathematics and Sports
- Statistics Education
- Teaching Advanced High School Mathematics
- Undergraduate Research
- Mathematics Instruction Using the WEB

== Awards and prizes ==
The MAA distributes many prizes, including the Chauvenet Prize and the Carl B. Allendoerfer Award, Trevor Evans Award, Lester R. Ford Award, George Pólya Award, Merten M. Hasse Prize, Henry L. Alder Award, Euler Book Prize awards, the Yueh-Gin Gung and Dr. Charles Y. Hu Award for Distinguished Service to Mathematics, and Beckenbach Book Prize.

== Memberships ==
The MAA is one of four partners in the Joint Policy Board for Mathematics (JPBM), and participates in the Conference Board of the Mathematical Sciences (CBMS), an umbrella organization of sixteen professional societies.

== Historical accounts ==
A detailed history of the first fifty years of the MAA appears in May (1972). A report on activities prior to World War II appears in Bennett (1967). Further details of its history can be found in Case (1996). In addition numerous regional sections of the MAA have published accounts of their local history. The MAA was established in 1915. But the roots of the Association can be traced to the 1894 founding of the American Mathematical Monthly by Benjamin Finkel, who wrote "Most of our existing journals deal almost exclusively with subjects beyond the reach of the average student or teacher of mathematics or at least with subjects with which they are familiar, and little, if any, space, is devoted to the solution of problems…No pains will be spared on the part of the Editors to make this the most interesting and most popular journal published in America."

The MAA records are preserved as part of the Archives of American Mathematics.

== Inclusivity ==
The MAA has for a long time followed a strict policy of inclusivity and non-discrimination.

In previous periods it was subject to the same problems of discrimination that were widespread across the United States. One notorious incident at a south-eastern sectional meeting in Nashville in 1951 has been documented by the American mathematician and equal rights activist Lee Lorch, who in 2007 received the most prestigious award given by the MAA (the Yueh-Gin Gung and Dr. Charles Y. Hu Award for Distinguished Service to Mathematics). The citation delivered at the 2007 MAA awards presentation, where Lorch received a standing ovation, recorded that:

"Lee Lorch, the chair of the mathematics department at Fisk University, and three Black colleagues, Evelyn Boyd (now Granville), Walter Brown, and H. M. Holloway came to the meeting and were able to attend the scientific sessions. However, the organizer for the closing banquet refused to honor the reservations of these four mathematicians. (Letters in Science, August 10, 1951, pp. 161–162 spell out the details). Lorch and his colleagues wrote to the governing bodies of the AMS and MAA seeking bylaws against discrimination. Bylaws were not changed, but non-discriminatory policies were established and have been strictly observed since then."

The Association's first woman president was Dorothy Lewis Bernstein (1979–1980).

In 1980, Gloria Ford Gilmer became the first Black woman on the board of governors.

Edray Goins became the first African American elected president in its 110-year history (elected 2025; term as president-elect began July 1, 2026; term as president begins July 1, 2027).

== Presidents ==
The presidents of the MAA:

- 1916 Earle R Hedrick
- 1917 Florian Cajori
- 1918 Edward V Huntington
- 1919 Herbert Ellsworth Slaught
- 1920 David Eugene Smith
- 1921 George A Miller
- 1922 Raymond C Archibald
- 1923 Robert D Carmichael
- 1924 Henry L Rietz
- 1925 Julian L Coolidge
- 1926 Dunham Jackson
- 1927–1928 Walter B Ford
- 1929–1930 John W Young
- 1931–1932 Eric T Bell
- 1933–1934 Arnold Dresden
- 1935–1936 David R Curtiss
- 1937–1938 Aubrey J Kempner
- 1939–1940 Walter B Carver
- 1941–1942 Raymond Woodard Brink
- 1943–1944 William D Cairns
- 1945–1946 Cyrus C MacDuffee
- 1947–1948 Lester R Ford
- 1949–1950 Rudolph E Langer
- 1951–1952 Saunders Mac Lane
- 1953–1954 Edward J McShane
- 1955–1956 William L Duren, Jr
- 1957–1958 G Baley Price
- 1959–1960 Carl B Allendoerfer
- 1961–1962 Albert W Tucker
- 1963–1964 R H Bing
- 1965–1966 Raymond L Wilder
- 1967–1968 Edwin E Moise
- 1969–1970 Gail S Young
- 1971–1972 Victor Klee
- 1973–1974 Ralph P Boas
- 1975–1976 Henry O Pollak
- 1977–1978 Henry L Alder
- 1979–1980 Dorothy L Bernstein
- 1981–1982 Richard D Anderson
- 1983–1984 Ivan Niven
- 1985–1986 Lynn A Steen
- 1987–1988 Leonard Gillman
- 1989–1990 Lida K Barrett
- 1991–1992 Deborah Tepper Haimo
- 1993–1994 Donald L Kreider
- 1995–1996 Kenneth A Ross
- 1997–1998 Gerald L Alexanderson
- 1999–2000 Thomas F Banchoff
- 2001–2002 Ann E. Watkins
- 2003–2004 Ronald L Graham
- 2005–2006 Carl C Cowen
- 2007–2008 Joseph A Gallian
- 2009–2010 David M Bressoud
- 2011–2012 Paul M Zorn
- 2013–2014 Bob Devaney
- 2015–2016 Francis E. Su
- 2017–2018 Deanna Haunsperger
- 2019–2020 Michael Dorff
- 2021-2022 Jennifer Quinn
- 2022-2025 Hortensia Soto
- 2025-Present Jenna Carpenter

== See also ==
- American Mathematical Association of Two-Year Colleges
- American Mathematical Society
- Computer-based mathematics education
- National Council of Teachers of Mathematics
- Society for Industrial and Applied Mathematics
