= Mary Mellish =

Mary Mellish may refer to:

- Mary Mellish (educator) (1849–1901), Canadian educator
- Mary Mellish (soprano) (1890–1955), American soprano
