= Oliver Dimon Kellogg =

American mathematician (1878–1932)

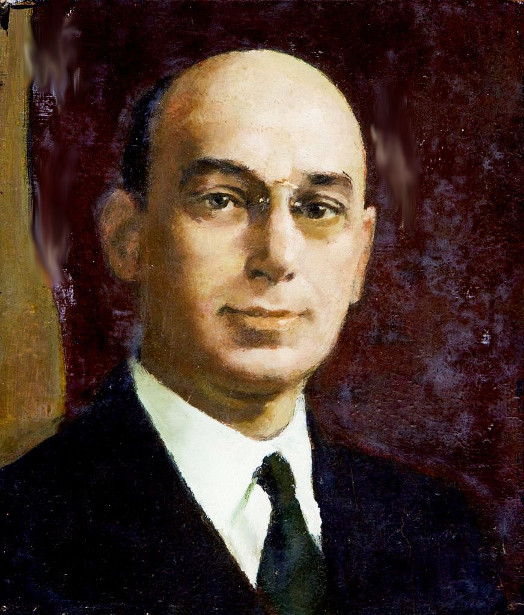
- Born: July 10, 1878; Linwood, Pennsylvania, US
- Died: August 27, 1932 (aged 54); Greenville, Maine, US
- Education: Georg-August-Universität Göttingen
- Known for: Kellogg's theorem Birkhoff–Kellogg invariant-direction theorem
- Scientific career
- Fields: Mathematics
- Workplaces: Harvard University
- Doctoral advisor: David Hilbert
- Doctoral students: Arthur Herbert Copeland

Oliver Dimon Kellogg (10 July 1878 – 27 August 1932) was an American mathematician.

His father, Day Otis Kellogg, was a professor of literature at the University of Kansas and editor of the American edition of the Encyclopædia Britannica. In 1895 Oliver Kellogg began his undergraduate study at Princeton University, where he earned his master's degree in 1900. With a John S. Kennedy stipend he first studied at the Humboldt University of Berlin and then in 1901/1902 at Georg-August-Universität Göttingen. At Göttingen in 1902 he earned his PhD with a thesis Zur Theorie der Integralgleichungen und des Dirichlet'schen Prinzips under the direction of David Hilbert. After completing his thesis, Kellogg became an instructor at Princeton and from 1905 at the University of Missouri, where he became a professor in 1910. In World War I he was a scientific advisor at the Coast Guard Academy in New London, Connecticut, where he worked on submarine detection. Kellogg became a lecturer at Harvard University in 1919, an associate professor in 1920, and a professor in 1927. He died of a heart attack while climbing Doubletop Mountain near Greenville, Maine. Kellogg was married and had a daughter.

Kellogg is known for his work on potential theory, which was the subject of his dissertation and also his famous 1929 textbook Foundations of Potential Theory. In 1922 with George David Birkhoff he generalized the Brouwer fixed point theorem to the theorem of Birkhoff–Kellogg.

Among his doctoral students was Arthur Copeland.

== Works ==
- with Earle Raymond Hedrick, Applications of the calculus to mechanics (Boston: Ginn, 1909)
- Foundations of Potential Theory. Grundlehren der Mathematischen Wissenschaften, Springer-Verlag 1967.
