= Raymond C. Archibald =

Canadian-American mathematician

- Born: Raymond Clare Archibald; 7 October 1875; South Branch, Stewiacke, Nova Scotia, Canada
- Died: 26 July 1955 (aged 79); Sackville, Westmorland, New Brunswick, Canada
- Education: Kaiser-Wilhelms-Universität Strassburg, Harvard University, Mount Allison University
- Known for: History of Mathematical Tables
- Awards: Membre Effective, Académie Internationale d'Historie des Sciences
- Scientific career
- Fields: History of Mathematics
- Workplaces: Mount Allison University, Sackville, New Brunswick, Brown University, Providence, Rhode Island
- Thesis: The Cardioide and Some of its Related Curves
- Doctoral advisor: Karl Theodor Reye

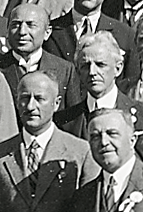
Left to right, background: Julius Wolff, Raymond Clare Archibald, foreground: Stefan Straszewicz, Henri Fehr, at the ICM 1932

Raymond Clare Archibald (7 October 1875 – 26 July 1955) was a Canadian-American mathematician. He is known for his work as a historian of mathematics, his editorships of mathematical journals and his contributions to the teaching of mathematics.

== Biography ==
Raymond Clare Archibald was born in South Branch, Stewiacke, Nova Scotia, on 7 October 1875. He was the son of Abram Newcomb Archibald (1849–1883) and Mary Mellish Archibald (1849–1901).

Archibald graduated in 1894 from Mount Allison College with B.A. degree in mathematics and teacher's certificate in violin. After teaching mathematics and violin for a year at the Mount Allison Ladies' College he went to Harvard where he received a B.A. 1896 and a M.A. in 1897. He then traveled to Europe where he attended the Humboldt University of Berlin during 1898 and received a Ph.D. cum laude from the University of Strasbourg in 1900. His advisor was Karl Theodor Reye and title of his dissertation was The Cardioide and Some of Its Related Curves.

He returned to Canada in 1900 and taught mathematics and violin at the Mount Allison Ladies' College until 1907. After a one-year appointment at Acadia University he accepted an invitation of join the mathematics department at Brown University. He stayed at Brown for the rest of his career becoming a Professor Emeritus in 1943. While at Brown he created one of the finest mathematical libraries in the western hemisphere.

Archibald returned to Mount Allison in 1954 to curate the Mary Mellish Archibald Memorial Library, the library he had founded in 1905 to honor his mother. At his death the library contained 23,000 volumes, 2,700 records, and 70,000 songs in American and English poetry and drama.

Raymond Clare Archibald was a world-renowned historian of mathematics with a lifelong concern for the teaching of mathematics in secondary schools. At the presentation of his portrait to Brown University, the head of the mathematics department, Professor Clarence Raymond Adams said of him:

"The instincts of the bibliophile were also his from early years. Possessing a passion for accurate detail, systematic by nature and blessed with a memory that was the marvel of his friends, he gradually acquired a knowledge of mathematical books and their values which has scarcely been equalled. This knowledge and an untiring energy he dedicated to the upbuilding of the mathematical library at Brown University. From modest beginnings he has developed this essential equipment of the mathematical investigator to a point where it has no superior, in completeness and in convenience for the user."

== Honors ==
Archibald received honorary degrees from the University of Padua (LL.D., 1922), Mount Allison University (LL.D., 1923) and from Brown University (M.A. ad eundem, 1943).

- Fellow, American Association for the Advancement of Science (1906)
- Member, Deutsche Mathematiker-Vereinigung (1908)
- Member, Edinburgh Mathematical Society (1909)
- Member, Mathematical Association (England) (1910)
- Member, Société Mathématique de France (1911)
- Member, London Mathematical Society (1912)
- Charter Member, Mathematical Association of America (1916); elected president for 1922
- Fellow, American Academy of Arts and Sciences (1917)
- Librarian, American Mathematical Society (1921–1941)
- Member, Circolo Matematico di Palermo (1922)
- Soci Fondatori, Unione Matematica Italiana (1924)
- Founding Member, History of Science Society (1924)
- Honorary Member, Society of Sciences, Cluj, Roumania (1929)
- Honorary Foreign Fellow, Masarykova Akademie Prace, Prague, Czecho-Slovakia (1930)
- Membre Effective, Académie Internationale d'Historie des Sciences (1931)
- Honorary Foreign Member, Polish Mathematical Society (1934)
- Honorary Member, New Brunswick Museum (1946)
- Honorary Member, Mathematical Association (England) (1949)

== Editorships ==
- Associate editor, Bulletin of the American Mathematical Society (1913–20)
- Editor-in-chief, American Mathematical Monthly (1919–21); associate editor (1918–19)
- Associate editor, Revue Semestrielles des Publications Mathématiques (1923–34)
- Associate editor, Isis (1924–48)
- Associate editor, Scripta Mathematica (1932–49)
- Founder and editor, Mathematical Tables and Other Aids to Computation (now Mathematics of Computation) (1943–49)
- Co-founder and editor, Eudemes

== Bibliography ==
Archibald's bibliography contains over 1,000 entries. He contributed to over 20 different journals, mathematical, scientific, educational and literary. The following are the books of which he is an author:

- Margaret Gordon, Lady Bannerman, Carlyle's First Love, John Lane, 1910, ISBN 9780659913456
- Euclid's Book on Divisions of Figures: (Περὶ διαιρέσεων βιβλίον): with a restoration based on Woepcke's text and on the Practica Geometriae of Leonardo Pisano, Cambridge University Press, 1916, ISBN 9780659914057
- The Training of Teachers of Mathematics for the Secondary Schools of the Countries Represented in the International Commission on the Teaching of Mathematics, U.S. Government Printing Office, 1917
- Benjamin Peirce, 1809–1880. Biographical Sketch and Bibliography, Mathematical Association of America, 1925
- Bibliography of Egyptian and Babylonian Mathematics, Plandome Press, 1929
- History of Mathematics, Mathematical Association of America, 1931
- Outline of the History of Mathematics, The Lancaster Press, 1932
- Bibliography of the Life and Works of Simon Newcomb, J. Hope and & Sons, 1932
- A Semicentennial History of the American Mathematical Society, American Mathematical Society, 1938, ISBN 9780821801185
- Mary Mellish Archibald Memory Library Guide for Students and Scholars, Mount Allison University, 1935–46
- Mathematical Table Makers, Scripta Mathematica, 1948
- Geometrical Constructions with a Ruler, Scripta Mathematica, 1950
- Historical Notes on the Education of Women at Mount Allison, 1854–1954, Mount Allison University, 1954
- Famous Problems of Elementary Geometry, Dover, 1955
- Archibald, R. C (1914). "Time as a Fourth Dimension" (PDF). Bulletin of the American Mathematical Society: 409–412.

== Biographies ==
- Biographisch-Literarisches Handwörterbuch zur Geschichte der Exacten Wissenschaften Enthaltend Nachweisungen über Lebensverhältnisse und Leitstunger von Mathematikern, Astronomen, Physikern, Chemikern, Mineralogen, Geologen usw. aller Völker und Zeiten ("Poggendorff"), 1904/22 and 1923/31
- American Men of Science, 1905 though 1955
- The Canadian Men and Women of the Time, 1912
- Who's Who in Science, International, 1913
- Who's Who in America, 1914/15 though 1954/55
- Who's Who, 1922 though 1955
- Encyclopædia Britannica, 1929
- Who's Who in American Education, 1935/36, with portrait
- The Compendium of American Genealogy, First Families of America, 1937
- The Canadian Who's Who, 1937/38 though 1952/54
- Who's Who in New England, 1916, 1938, 1948
- The National Cyclopaedia of American Biography, 1938
- Who's Who Among North American Authors, 1927/28 though 1936/40
- Leaders in Education: A Biographical Directory, 1941
- Directory of American Scholars. A Biographical Directory, 1942
- Who's Who in the East, 1948 though 1953
- World Biography, 1948 and 1954
- The Author's & Writer's Who's Who, 1949
- Who knows, and what, among authorities, experts, and the specially informed, 1949
- The International Who is Who in Music, 1951
- The New Century Cyclopedia of Names, 1954
- Who Was Who. 1951–1960, 1964
- Who Was Who in America. 1951–1960, 1964.
- International Personal Bibliographie, 1800—1943
- Enciclopedia Universal Ilustrada Europeo-Americana, Madrid, 1905—1930
- Internationale Bibliographie der Zeitschriftenliteratur aus allen Gebieten des Wissens
- A Bio-Bibliographical Finding List of Canadian Musicians
- Isis Cumulative Bibliography
- MacTutor
- Harvard College Class of 1896. Fiftieth Anniversary Report, 1946
