= Walter Burton Ford =

American mathematician (1874–1971)

Walter Burton Ford (May 18, 1874 in Oneonta, New York – February 24, 1971 in Seneca County, New York) was an American mathematician and philanthropist.

== Career ==
The Great Comet of 1882 sparked his interest in mathematics.

He graduated from Oneonta State Normal School (now SUNY Oneonta) in 1893, and then enrolled at Amherst College. After two years, he left Amherst and enrolled at Harvard University. From Harvard he received his A.B. degree magna cum laude in 1897 and an M.A. in 1898.

After his Harvard graduate studies, he began his teaching career with one year at Albany Normal School (now SUNY Albany), and then a year at the Albany Academy. In 1900 he returned to Harvard to begin work on his doctorate. Harvard recommended Ford to the University of Michigan in their search for a new mathematics instructor, and he accepted the post. His duties "consisted of a heavy load of teaching freshmen only, and in classes so large that students were using radiators as well as chairs and benches for seats. But, at last I was started on my chosen career."

Ford spent 1903 and 1904 in France and Italy, learning new developments in math. He spent significant time with Ulisse Dini, whose work on divergent series he had closely followed earlier in Michigan. Upon his return to the United States in 1904, he took a one-year post teaching at Williams College. During this time, his Harvard PhD dissertation, under the direction of Maxime Bôcher, was rejected by Harvard upon its first submissionas being "of little significance". Ford sent his dissertation to the French Journal de Mathématiques Pures et Appliquées, which responded enthusiastically on the paper. The French response made Harvard reconsider their criticisms, and subsequently awarded Ford his doctorate in 1905.

Ford then returned to the University of Michigan and remained there until his retirement in 1940. He became assistant professor in 1907, junior professor in 1910, associate professor in 1915, and full professor in 1917.

He played a significant role in mathematics education in the US by co-writing a series of textbooks with Earle Hedrick that were widely used in secondary schools and colleges. He edited the American Mathematical Monthly from 1923 to 1926. He served as president of the Mathematical Association of America in 1927–1928.

== Selected publications ==
- Plane and Solid Geometry (1913)
- Studies on Divergent Series and Summability (1916)
- First course in Algebra (1919, with Charles Ammerman)
- Second course in Algebra (1920, with Charles Ammerman)
- College Algebra (1922)
- Analytic Geometry (1924)
- A First Course In The Differential and Integral Calculus (1928)
- The Asymptotic Developments of Functions defined by Maclaurin Series

== Personal life ==
Ford met his future wife Edith W. Banker when he was a senior and she a freshman at Oneonta State Normal School. They had an eight-year courtship, at times distant, that lasted while she completed studies in Oneonta and he was at Amherst, while she was studying at Radcliffe while he was at Harvard, his graduate studies in Europe, and her first teaching position in New Britain, Connecticut. Immediately after Ford received his University of Michigan post, they married in October 1900 at her parents' farm in Ovid, New York. They left immediately for Ann Arbor, where they lived until Ford's retirement from University of Michigan.

The Fords were frequent visitors to Edith's hometown of Ovid. In 1908 they purchased property on Cayuga Lake. After retirement, the Fords moved into the house they had built on this property.

Edith died in 1959 at the age of 85. Walter died in 1979 at the age of 96. They are both buried in Ovid Union Cemetery. They had two sons, Sylvester and Clinton. Sylvester, a doctor, died in 1956. Clinton, an investor, musician, and amateur astronomer, died in 1992; he is also buried at Ovid Union Cemetery.

== Philanthropy ==
Ford's father and uncles were early investors in the Bundy Manufacturing Company in Binghamton, New York. This company eventually became IBM, and their investments provided Ford the wealth for his significant charitable endeavors.

In 1928, he funded the Mathematical Association of America's Chauvenet Prize switch from being awarded every 5 years to 3 years.

In Ovid, New York, Ford donated the funds for the Edith B. Ford Memorial Library, and in 1970 donated the funds for a new municipal building.

He made gifts to many educational institutions including Harvard University, the University of Michigan, Eisenhower College (of which he was a charter trustee), Wells College, and Ithaca College. At Ithaca College, the new concert hall in 1965 was named the Walter B. Ford Hall, and in 1968 Ford purchased the hall's new pipe organ, a three-manual 80-rank organ made by Schlicker Company.

Ford's will established The New York Community Trust's Walter B. Ford Fund. His estate also funded the Mathematical Association of America's Walter B. Ford Lecture Fund.
