= George D. Birkhoff House =

Historic house in Massachusetts, United States

- U.S. National Register of Historic Places
- U.S. National Historic Landmark
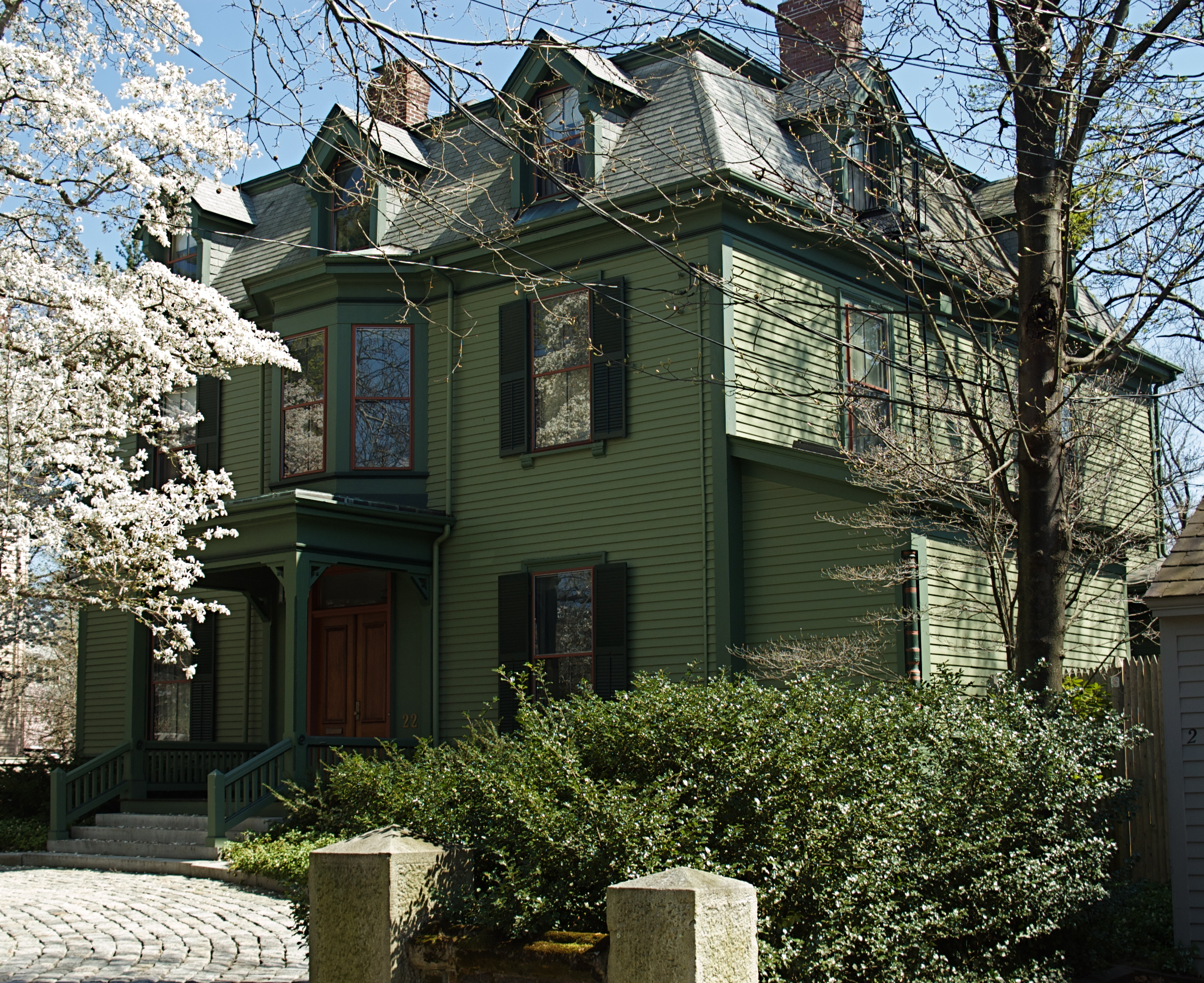

- Location within Massachusetts Location within the United States
- Location: 22 Craigie, Cambridge, Massachusetts
- Coordinates: 42°22′41.5″N 71°7′43.0″W
- Built: 1912
- Architectural style: Late 19th and 20th century revivals
- NRHP reference No.: 75000295

Significant dates
- Added to NRHP: May 15, 1975
- Designated NHL: January 15, 1975

The George D. Birkhoff House is a historic house, at 22 Craigie Street, Cambridge, Massachusetts. It was designated a National Historic Landmark in 1975 for its association with Harvard University professor George David Birkhoff (1884–1944), one of the most important mathematicians of his time.

The house is a three-story Second Empire wood-frame structure with a mansard roof. Its date of construction is not known, but is surmised to be before the 1890s. The house is not architecturally distinguished, but its exterior has not been significantly altered since its construction. Changes made to the interior, of center-hall plan, include the additions of a cathedral ceiling to the front parlor conversion and of modern plumbing.

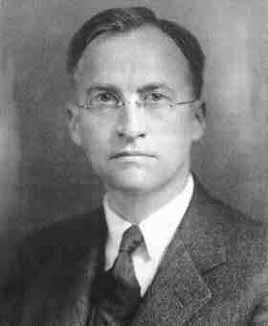
George David Birkhoff

George David Birkhoff was born in Michigan and educated at the University of Chicago and Harvard in mathematics. In 1912 he accepted a teaching position at Harvard, where he remained for the rest of his life. Birkhoff helped to advance mathematics, solving Henri Poincaré's "last geometric theorem" and developing the ergodic theorem, a thesis important in statistical physics and the study of dynamical systems. Virtually every honor available to mathematicians was bestowed on him during his life, and there is a prize named in his honor.

Birkhoff lived in this house for eight years, from 1920 to 1928. It was made a National Historic Landmark and listed on the National Register of Historic Places in 1975.

== See also ==
- List of National Historic Landmarks in Massachusetts
- National Register of Historic Places listings in Cambridge, Massachusetts
