= Magical Melons =

Children's historical novel by Carol Ryrie Brink

- 1944 edition
- Author: Carol Ryrie Brink
- Illustrator: Marguerite Davis
- Language: English
- Series: Caddie Woodlawn
- Genre: Children's historical novel
- Publisher: Macmillan
- Publication date: 1939
- Publication place: United States
- Media type: Print (Hardback & Paperback)
- Pages: 193
- ISBN: 0-689-71416-5
- OCLC: 21077278
- LC Class: PZ7.B78 Mag 1990
- Preceded by: Caddie Woodlawn

Magical Melons (also published as Caddie Woodlawn's Family) is a children's historical novel by Carol Ryrie Brink, first published in 1939. It is the sequel to the Newbery-Award-winning novel Caddie Woodlawn.

== Plot ==
Set between 1863 and 1866, Magical Melons takes the form of a collection of stories about the Woodlawn family, with many stories overlapping chronologically with the first book.
