= Kempner number =

Mathematical constant; sum of 1 / 2^2^n

- Rationality: Transcendental

Representations
- Decimal: 0.81642150902189314370... (sequence A007404 in the OEIS)
- Continued fraction (linear): [0;1,4,2,4,4,6,4,2,4,6,...] (sequence A007400 in the OEIS)
- Binary: 0.11010001000000010000... (sequence A036987 in the OEIS)

The Kempner number is the sum of the series

$$\kappa:=2^{-2^0} + 2^{-2^1} + 2^{-2^2} + \cdots = \sum_{n\ge 0} 2^{-2^n}.$$

It is named after Aubrey Kempner, who proved it transcendental in 1916. It is an example of a number easy to prove transcendental which is not a Liouville number.

== Properties ==
By definition, the binary expansion of the Kempner number has zeroes everywhere except at places which are powers of two:

κ = 0.110100010000000100000000000000010000000000000000000000000000000100... (base two.)

Since the first proof of transcendence by Kempner, many other proofs have been given; see the references.

Jeffrey Shallit has proven that it has a simple continued fraction expansion, obtainable by the following construction:

1. Start with the partial expansion [0, 1, 3].
2. If the partial expansion is [a, b, ..., y, z], replace it by [a, b, ..., y, z + 1, z − 1, y, ..., b].
3. If this generated a zero, replace [..., a, 0, b, ...] by [..., a + b, ...].
4. Repeat steps 2 and 3 indefinitely.

This generates the expansion (sequence A007400 in the OEIS)

$$[0; 1, 4, 2, 4, 4, 6, 4, 2, 4, 6, ...]=0+\cfrac {1}{1+\cfrac {1}{4+\cfrac {1}{2 + \cfrac{1}{4 + \ _{\ddots}}}}}.$$

After the first partial quotients, the remainders are all 2, 4 or 6. Since this continued fraction has bounded partial quotients, the Kempner number has irrationality measure 2.
