= The American Mathematical Monthly =

Academic mathematics journal

American Mathematical Monthly
- Discipline: Mathematics
- Language: English
- Edited by: Annalisa Crannell

Publication details
- History: 1894–present
- Publisher: Taylor & Francis on behalf of the Mathematical Association of America (United States)
- Frequency: 10/year
- Open access: Hybrid
- Impact factor: 0.4 (2023)

Standard abbreviations
- ISO 4: Am. Math. Mon.
- MathSciNet: Amer. Math. Monthly

Indexing
- ISSN: 0002-9890 (print); 1930-0972 (web)
- LCCN: sn99023390
- JSTOR: 00029890
- OCLC no.: 643084321

Links
- Journal homepage; Online access; Online archive; Journal page at society website

The American Mathematical Monthly is a peer-reviewed scientific journal of mathematics. It was established by Benjamin Finkel in 1894 and is published by Taylor & Francis on behalf of the Mathematical Association of America. It is "the most widely read mathematics journal in the world" and is intended for a wide audience of mathematicians. The editor-in-chief is Annalisa Crannell. The journal gives the Lester R. Ford Award annually to "authors of articles of expository excellence" published in the journal.

== History ==
In January of 1894, Benjamin Finkel established the journal naming it "The American Mathematical Monthly." Finkel and John Marvin Colaw were the founding editors of the journal. The journal was founded to be "a journal for teachers of mathematics in the collegiate and advanced secondary fields."

Between 1913 and 1916 the journal was self-published by its owners at the time: the University of Chicago, University of Colorado, University of Illinois, Indiana University, University of Iowa, University of Kansas, University of Michigan, University of Minnesota, University of Missouri, University of Nebraska, Northwestern University, Washington University, Colorado College, and Oberlin College.

Since 2018, the journal has been published in English by Taylor & Francis on behalf of the Mathematical Association of America when they formed a publishing partnership. The journal generally releases an issue every month except July and August.

=== Editors-in-chief ===
The following persons are or have been editor-in-chief:

- 2026–present: Annalisa Crannell
- 2022–2025: Della Dumbaugh
- 2017–2021: Susan Colley
- 2012–2016: Scott T. Chapman
- 2007–2011: Daniel J. Velleman
- 2002–2006: Bruce Palka
- 1997–2001: Roger A. Horn
- 1992–1996: John H. Ewing
- 1987–1991: Herbert S. Wilf
- 1982–1986: Paul Richard Halmos
- 1978–1981: Ralph Philip Boas, Jr.
- 1977–1978: Alex Rosenberg and Ralph Philip Boas Jr.
- 1974–1976: Alex Rosenberg
- 1969–1973: Harley Flanders
- 1967–1968: Robert Abraham Rosenbaum
- 1962–1966: Frederick Arthur Ficken
- 1957–1961: Ralph Duncan James
- 1952–1956: Carl Barnett Allendoerfer
- 1947–1951: Carroll Vincent Newsom
- 1942–1946: Lester Randolph Ford
- 1937–1941: Elton James Moulton
- 1932–1936: Walter Buckingham Carver
- 1927–1931: William Henry Bussey
- 1923–1926: Walter Burton Ford
- 1922: Albert Arnold Bennett
- 1919–1921: Raymond Clare Archibald
- 1918: Robert Daniel Carmichael
- 1916–1917: Herbert Ellsworth Slaught
- 1914–1915: Board of editors: C.H. Ashton, R.P. Baker, W.C. Brenke, W.H. Bussey, W.DeW. Cairns, Florian Cajori, R.D. Carmichael, D.R. Curtiss, I.M. DeLong, B.F. Finkel, E.R. Hedrick, L.C. Karpinski, G.A. Miller, W.H. Roever, H.E. Slaught
- 1913: Herbert Ellsworth Slaught
- 1909–1912: Benjamin Franklin Finkel, Herbert Ellsworth Slaught, George Abram Miller
- 1907–1908: Benjamin Franklin Finkel, Herbert Ellsworth Slaught
- 1905–1906: Benjamin Franklin Finkel, Leonard Eugene Dickson, Oliver Edmunds Glenn
- 1904: Benjamin Franklin Finkel, Leonard Eugene Dickson, Saul Epsteen
- 1903: Benjamin Franklin Finkel, Leonard Eugene Dickson
- 1894–1902: Benjamin Franklin Finkel, John Marvin Colaw

== See also ==
- College Mathematics Journal
- Math Horizons
- Mathematics Magazine
- Notices of the American Mathematical Society
