= Kempner function =

Arithmetical function

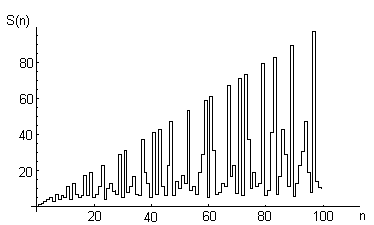
Graph of the Kempner function

In number theory, the Kempner function $S(n)$ is defined for a given positive integer $n$ to be the smallest number $s$ such that $n$ divides the factorial $s!$. For example, the number $8$ does not divide $1!$, $2!$, or $3!$, but does divide $4!$, so $S(8)=4$.

This function has a highly irregular growth rate: it grows linearly on the prime numbers but only grows sublogarithmically at the factorial numbers.

== History ==
This function was first considered by François Édouard Anatole Lucas in 1883, followed by Joseph Jean Baptiste Neuberg in 1887. In 1918, A. J. Kempner gave an algorithm for computing $S(n)$ without trials.

The Kempner function is also sometimes called the Smarandache function following Florentin Smarandache's rediscovery of the function in 1980.

== Properties ==
Since $n$ divides $n!$, $S(n)$ is always at most $n$. A number $n>4$ is prime if and only if $S(n)=n$. That is, the numbers $n$ for which $S(n)$ is as large as possible relative to $n$ are the primes. In the other direction, the numbers for which $S(n)$ is as small as possible are the factorials: $S(k!)=k$, for all $k\ge 1$.

$S(n)$ is the smallest possible degree of a monic polynomial with integer coefficients, whose values over the integers are all divisible by $n$. For instance, the fact that $S(6)=3$ means that there is a cubic polynomial whose values are all zero modulo 6, for instance the polynomial
$$x(x-1)(x-2)=x^3-3x^2+2x,$$
but that all quadratic or linear polynomials (with leading coefficient one) are nonzero modulo 6 at some integers.

In one of the advanced problems in The American Mathematical Monthly, set in 1991 and solved in 1994, Paul Erdős pointed out that the function $S(n)$ coincides with the largest prime factor of $n$ for "almost all" $n$ (in the sense that the asymptotic density of the set of exceptions is zero).

== Computational complexity ==
The Kempner function $S(n)$ of an arbitrary number $n$ is the maximum, over the prime powers $p^e$ dividing $n$, of $S(p^e)$. When $n$ is itself a prime power $p^e$, its Kempner function may be found in polynomial time by sequentially scanning the multiples of $p$ until finding the first one whose factorial contains enough multiples of $p$. The same algorithm can be extended to any $n$ whose prime factorization is already known, by applying it separately to each prime power in the factorization and choosing the one that leads to the largest value.

For a number of the form $n=px$, where $p$ is prime and $x<p$, the Kempner function of $n$ is $p$. It follows from this that computing the Kempner function of a semiprime (a product of two primes) is computationally equivalent to finding its prime factorization, believed to be a difficult problem. More generally, whenever $n$ is composite, the greatest common divisor of $S(n)$ and $n$ will necessarily be a nontrivial divisor of $n$, allowing $n$ to be factored by repeated evaluations of the Kempner function. Therefore, computing the Kempner function can in general be no easier than factoring composite numbers.

== See also ==
- Ruler function, a simpler integer function with an inconsistent growth rate
