= David R. Brink =

Attorney and president of the American Bar Association

David Ryrie Brink (July 28, 1919 – July 20, 2017) was an American attorney from Minnesota and a former president of the American Bar Association.

== Career ==
Born in Minneapolis, Brink was a specialist in estate planning. After graduating from the University of Minnesota and beginning law school at the U of M, he left to become a cryptographer in the Navy decoding Japanese messages in Washington, D.C., during World War II. He achieved rank of lieutenant commander. After WWII David Brink returned to the U of M Law School and finished his law degree. He graduated from the University of Minnesota and the University of Minnesota Law School and joined the Minnesota law firm of Dorsey & Whitney.

While leading the ABA in 1981, Brink battled Congress in an attempt to secure the independence of the federal court system.

== Personal ==
Brink's parents were mathematics professor Raymond W. Brink (1890–1973) and author Carol Ryrie Brink (1895–1981). They met as teenagers in Moscow, Idaho, in 1909 and were married nine years later. Married for 55 years, they had two children, David and Nora (Hunter).

Brink married Mary Helen Wangensteen (1925–2010) in 1950 and they had four children; Mary, Anne, David, and Sarah, and eight grandchildren. They later divorced, but were on good terms at the time of her death. His second wife, Irma Marie Lorentz Bong Brink, died in March 2008 at age 82. David Brink died on July 20, 2017, at the age of 97, 8 days before his 98th birthday.
