= Herbert Ellsworth Slaught =

American mathematician

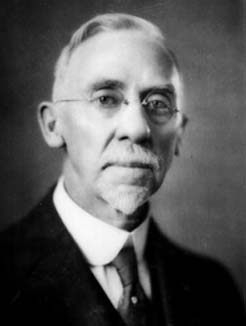
- Born: July 21, 1861; Watkins Glen, New York
- Died: May 21, 1937 (aged 75); Chicago, Illinois
- Education: Colgate University
- Spouse: Mary L Davis
- Scientific career
- Fields: Mathematics
- Workplaces: Chicago University
- Thesis: The Cross Ratio Group of 120 Quadratic Cremona Transformations of the Plane (1898)
- Doctoral advisor: Eliakim Hastings Moore

Herbert Ellsworth Slaught (1861–1937) was an American mathematician who was president of the Mathematical Association of America and editor of the journal American Mathematical Monthly.

== Life and work ==
Slaught, born in the Finger Lakes area, left his place of birth when he was 13 years old, due to the bankruptcy of the family's farm. The family moved to Hamilton, New York, where he studied at Colgate University, graduating in 1883. After teaching some years at the Peddie School (Hightstown, New Jersey), he received in 1892 a fellowship from the University of Chicago, where he was awarded a PhD in 1898. Slaught remained as professor at Chicago for the rest of his academic life, till his retirement in 1931.

In 1907, he became editor of the American Mathematical Monthly, a journal addressed to secondary teachers of mathematics. During his years as editor he worked heavily to broad the basis of the journal. He was founding member of the National Council of Teachers of Mathematics and an early member of the American Mathematical Society. He did not do research in mathematics, but his inspired teaching encouraged a lot of young people to follow a career in this matter.

Slaught was the main initiator of the Mathematical Association of America (MAA), which publishes the American Mathematical Monthly. His idea was to form a non-profit organization to publish a mathematical journal supported by the dues paid by the organization's members. He stated that the purpose of the American Mathematical Monthly is "to stimulate activity on the part of college teachers ... that may lead to production".

== Bibliography ==
- Bliss, G.A. (1938). "Herbert Ellsworth Slaught—Teacher and Friend". The American Mathematical Monthly. 45 (1): 5–10. doi:10.1080/00029890.1938.11990758. ISSN 0002-9890.
- Cairns, W.D. (1938). "Herbert Ellsworth Slaught—Editor and Organizer". The American Mathematical Monthly. 45 (1): 1–4. doi:10.1080/00029890.1938.11990757. ISSN 0002-9890.
- Suzuki, Jeff (2009). Mathematics in Historical Context. The Mathematical Association of America. ISBN 978-0-88385-570-6.
- Zitarelli, David E. (2015). "The Mathematical Association of America: Its First 100 years". In Stephen F. Kennedy; et al. (eds.). A Century of Advancing Mathematics. The Mathematical Association of America. ISBN 978-0-88385-588-1.
- Zorn, Paul (2015). A Century of Advancing Mathematics. The Mathematical Association of America. pp. 139–140. ISBN 978-0-88385-588-1. p. 140
