= Baby Island =

1937 novel by Carol Ryrie Brink

- First edition (publ. Macmillan)
- Author: Carol Ryrie Brink
- Language: English
- Publisher: Macmillan
- Publication date: 1937
- OCLC: 299198
- LC Class: PZ7.B78 Bab

Baby Island is a children's novel by Carol Ryrie Brink, first published in 1937. It resembles Robinson Crusoe in that the protagonists Mary and Jean are stranded on a desert island – but with four babies. The novel was republished many times over the next several decades.

It is one of the few early "Robinsonades" that focuses on girls. Although its basis is in survival literature, it is a humorous story that has been a comedic favorite over the years.

== Plot summary ==
The book begins with the Wallace sisters, twelve-year-old Mary and ten-year-old Jean, traveling alone on a ship to meet their father in Australia. The girls often babysit young children: at home, they had enjoyed "borrowing" the babies of neighbors.

Their ship is disabled in a storm, and the two girls are set adrift in a lifeboat with four babies, the children of fellow passengers. The craft eventually drifts to a tropical island, and in a Robinson Crusoe-like scenario, they must learn to build shelter and survive on wild foodstuffs. They do this with great success, through their courage and dedication, while raising the babies through various developmental milestones and adopting a baby monkey who they raise alongside the babies.

Throughout the story, the girls sing "Scots Wha Hae" to inspire their courage to deal with their situation.

In the latter part of the book the girls also encounter a character like Friday: Mr. Peterkin—a mysterious, gruff man who lives alone on the island and dislikes children. He eventually warms to the Wallaces' babies, and they enjoy his company and his useful craftsmanship.

A strong storm on Christmas Eve destroys much of what the girls had built on the island, which they find disheartening. On Christmas Day, after three months on the island, the girls are rescued and all the babies are returned to their parents. Their parents were able to find them through the letters Jean had set adrift in tin cans, a form of a message in a bottle. Mr. Peterkin decides to leave the island and go to marry his sweetheart, having changed his mind about children.
