= Archie Phinney =

Nez Perce-American anthropologist (1904–1949)

Archie Phinney (September 4, 1904 – October 29, 1949) was a Nez Perce Indian anthropologist.

== Biography ==
Born in Culdesac, Idaho, to Fitch Phinney, Archie Phinney was five-eighths Nez Perce, but was also proud to claim William Craig as his great-grandfather. Craig (1807–69) was a fur trapper and the first permanent white settler in the region in 1840. A 1922 graduate of Culdesac High School, Phinney attended the University of Kansas in Lawrence. He received his Bachelor of Arts degree in 1926 and was the first Native American to graduate from the university. He later took graduate courses in anthropology at George Washington University, New York University, and Columbia University.

Phinney wrote the Nez Perce Texts, which are a collection of Nez Perce myths that he recorded from his mother, Mary Lily Phinney (Wayi'latpu). The text were written with alternating lines of English and Nez Perce followed by an English summary. The text was funded by the Committee on Research in Native American Languages, composed of Franz Boas of the anthropology department of Columbia University and Leonard Bloomfield and Edward Sapir of the anthropology department of the University of Chicago. The texts were compiled while Phinney was in Leningrad in 1933–37 where he was a researcher and lectured at the Academy of Sciences in Leningrad.

Upon returning to the U.S., Phinney worked for the Bureau of Indian Affairs as a Field Agent at Minneapolis, Albuquerque, Denver, and Window Rock, Arizona. Phinney was a leading founder of the National Congress of American Indians, 1944.

== Final years ==
He was the superintendent of the Northern Idaho Agency in Lapwai from 1944 until his death in 1949. Hospitalized in Lewiston for several days, he died from a hemorrhage due to an ulcer on October 29 at age 45. He was buried at the Jacques Spur cemetery in Culdesac, alongside his parents and not far from his great-grandfather, William Craig.

== Legacy ==
A faculty office building at the University of Idaho in Moscow was named in his honor on April 3, 1987. Originally the Chrisman Hall dormitory, it was later the Faculty Office Complex West. Its companion east building was named for author Carol Ryrie Brink five years prior, in 1982.
