= Birkhoff–Kellogg invariant-direction theorem =

In functional analysis, the Birkhoff–Kellogg invariant-direction theorem, named after G. D. Birkhoff and O. D. Kellogg, is a generalization of the Brouwer fixed-point theorem. The theorem states that:

Let U be a bounded open neighborhood of 0 in an infinite-dimensional normed linear space V, and let F:∂U → V be a compact map satisfying ||F(x)|| ≥ α for some α > 0 for all x in ∂U. Then F has an invariant direction, i.e., there exist some x_{o} and some λ > 0 satisfying x_{o} = λF(x_{o}).

The Birkhoff–Kellogg theorem and its generalizations by Schauder and Leray have applications to partial differential equations.
