= Caddie Woodlawn =

1935 historical fiction novel by Carol Ryrie Brink

- Author: Carol Ryrie Brink
- Cover artist: Trina Schart Hyman (1973)
- Language: English
- Series: Caddie Woodlawn
- Genre: Children's novel, historical
- Publisher: Simon & Schuster Children's Publishing
- Publication date: 1935
- Publication place: United States
- Media type: Print (hardback)
- Pages: 275
- ISBN: 1-4169-4028-6
- OCLC: 77530618
- Followed by: Magical Melons

Caddie Woodlawn is a children's historical fiction novel by Carol Ryrie Brink that received the Newbery Medal in 1936 and a Lewis Carroll Shelf Award in 1958. The original 1935 edition was illustrated by Newbery-award-winning author and illustrator Kate Seredy. Macmillan released a later edition in 1973, illustrated by Trina Schart Hyman.

== Plot ==
Set in the 1860s, the novel is about a lively eleven-year-old tomboy named Caroline Augusta Woodlawn, nicknamed "Caddie", living in the area of Dunnville, Wisconsin. As a young girl, she made the journey there from Boston with her family, one that nearly cost her life. Sickly and weak, she is allowed to run wild with her brothers, Tom and Warren, to regain her health. They spend much of their time exploring the woods and rivers that surround their farm. The book opens with Caddie being late for dinner after an excursion to visit the local Indian tribe, embarrassing her mother with her antics. She, undaunted, spends the next year having a string of adventures and scares. From a midnight ride through the forest to warn her friend, "Indian John", that the settlers are planning an attack, to a prairie fire that brings out the best in Obediah, the school bully, to a life-threatening fall through a lake while ice skating, her life is far from boring. Things come to a head when "perfect" Cousin Annabelle from Boston arrives for a visit, and Caddie is forced to confront her future. Tom and Warren, always a part of her adventures, come along for the journey. This story is full of practical jokes and touching moments, like Nero's long journey home - a beloved pet dog that was taken by Caddie's uncle to be "educated." It tells the story of a family's existence on the frontier during the Civil War and offers insights into how life was lived in a small Wisconsin village where fear of local Indians was a reality, and life and death situations arose with frightening regularity. The sequel, Magical Melons (1939), continues the story of Caddie Woodlawn.

== Background ==
Brink (1895–1981) was born and raised in Moscow, Idaho, in the Palouse region. Orphaned at age eight following her mother's suicide, she lived there with her widowed maternal grandmother and an unmarried aunt; the former had grown up on a farm in Wisconsin. In a preface to the later edition of Caddie Woodlawn, she said the books were partly based on the life of her grandmother, Caddie Woodhouse Watkins (1853–1940), and her siblings: older sister Clara, older brother Tom, younger brother Warren, younger sisters Hetty and Minnie, and baby brother Joe.

The house where Caddie lived is now a historical site, about 12 miles (19 km) south of Menomonie, Wisconsin.

== Critical reception ==
Children's literature expert May Hill Arbuthnot says of Caddie Woodlawn, "this book is far less of a frontier story—settlers versus Indians—than it is the entertaining evolution of a tomboy. The fun Caddie gets out of life suggests the usefulness of this book in counteracting the over-seriousness of most historical fiction." Kirkus Reviews said it provides "an authentic picture of life on a frontier farm when massacre was a real threat and when a livelihood, hardly earned, allowed for fun in natural outdoor things." It won the Newbery Medal in 1936.

The book's portrayal of Native Americans has been criticized in more recent years. Debbie Reese, founder of the website American Indians in Children's Literature, shared her daughter's pained reaction to reading it in school in "Reflections on Caddie Woodlawn: Teaching about Stereotypes using Literature."

== Adaptations ==
Brink transformed Caddie Woodlawn into a radio drama in 1945.

In 1989, a made-for-television movie based on the book for WonderWorks was directed by Giles Walker with teleplay by Joe Wisenfeld and Richard John Davis. Emily Schulman portrayed Caddie. Several changes were made from the book, most notably moving the conflict between the settlers and Indians toward the end, and greatly increasing the role of Caddie's cousin, Annabelle. A musical, Caddie Woodlawn A Musical Adventure (The Caddie Woodlawn Musical), by Tom Shelton and Susan C. Hunter, Brink's granddaughter, was also based on the book.

Awards
Preceded by Dobry	Newbery Medal recipient 1936	Succeeded by Roller Skates
