= Carol Ryrie Brink =

American novelist (1895-1981)

- Born: Caroline Sybil Ryrie; December 28, 1895; Moscow, Idaho, US
- Died: August 15, 1981 (aged 85); La Jolla, California, US
- Education: Bachelor of Arts
- Alma mater: University of California, 1918; University of Idaho (3 yrs)
- Occupation: Writer
- Spouses: Raymond W. Brink; (1890–1973); (m. 1918–73, his death)
- Children: David R. Brink (b. 1919); Nora Caroline Brink Hunter
- Writing career
- Language: English
- Genres: Children's and adult novels
- Notable work: Caddie Woodlawn
- Notable awards: Newbery Medal; 1936

Carol Ryrie Brink (December 28, 1895 – August 15, 1981) was an American writer of over thirty juvenile and adult books. Her novel Caddie Woodlawn won the 1936 Newbery Medal and a Lewis Carroll Shelf Award in 1958.

== Lifetime ==
Caroline Sybil Ryrie born in Moscow, Idaho, the only child of Alexander and Henrietta (Watkins) Ryrie. Her father, an immigrant from Scotland, was the city's mayor (1895–97) and her mother was the daughter of prominent physician Dr. William W. Watkins, the first president of the state's medical association and a member of the board of regents of the new University of Idaho. After Alex Ryrie died in 1900, Henrietta remarried, but after her father was murdered in 1901, her second marriage (to Elisha Nathaniel Brown) failed and she committed suicide in 1904 at age twenty-nine. Carol was then raised in Moscow by her widowed maternal grandmother, Caroline Woodhouse Watkins, the model for Caddie Woodlawn. Her grandmother's life and storytelling abilities inspired Carol's writing from an early age.

Brink started writing for her school newspapers and continued that in college; she graduated from the Portland Academy in Oregon and attended the University of Idaho in Moscow for three years (1914–17). She wrote for The Argonaut student newspaper and Gem of the Mountains yearbook and was a member of Gamma Phi Beta sorority. She transferred to the University of California, Berkeley for her senior year in 1917 and graduated Phi Beta Kappa in 1918, then on June 12 married Raymond W. Brink, a young mathematics professor she had met in Moscow nine years earlier. He had joined the faculty at the University of Minnesota a year prior and the couple made their home in St. Paul for 42 years. The Brinks raised a son (David) and a daughter (Nora), spent summers in the Wisconsin backwoods, and traveled for several years in Scotland and France.

Brink’s first novel, Anything Can Happen on the River, was published in 1934. Brink wrote fiction throughout her life, and added poetry and painting to her later accomplishments. After 55 years of marriage, her husband died in 1973, and she died eight years later of heart failure at age 85 in La Jolla, California. In her family, the name Caroline or Carol has been given as either a first or middle name to the oldest female child without interruption for at least seven generations, continuing to the present day.

=== Hometown honors ===
Brink was awarded an honorary doctorate of letters from the University of Idaho in 1965. At the university is Brink Hall, a faculty office building which includes the English department. A classic ivy-covered brick structure, built in the 1930s to appear much older, it was originally the Willis Sweet dormitory and later the Faculty Office Complex East. Named for her shortly after her death, its companion west building was named for Archie Phinney. Across town in east Moscow is "Carol Ryrie Brink Nature Park," a stream restoration area alongside Paradise Creek on land owned by the school district. Dedicated during the centennial celebration of Brink's birth in 1995, its west entrance is at Mountain View Road and 7th Street. At the city's north end, the children's section at the refurbished Carnegie building of the Moscow Public Library contains the "Carol Ryrie Brink Reading Room." Opened in 1906, Brink had frequented that library as a youth.

== Works ==
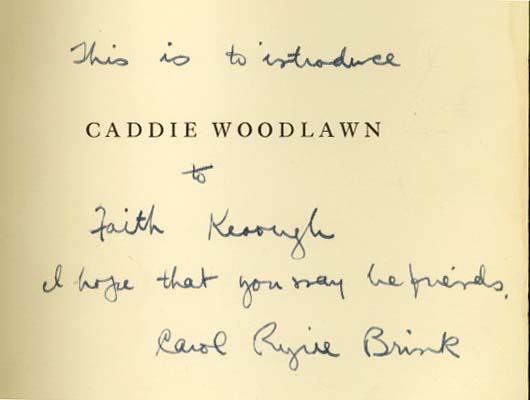

=== Novels ===
- 1934 Anything Can Happen on the River
- 1935 Caddie Woodlawn
- 1936 Mademoiselle Misfortune
- 1937 Baby Island
- 1937 Goody O'Grumpity
- 1939 All Over Town
- 1939 Magical Melons (Note: Magical Melons is now published as "Caddie Woodlawn's Family.")
- 1941 Lad with a Whistle
- 1944 Buffalo Coat
- 1945 Narcissa Whitman
- 1945 Minty et Compagnie
- 1946 Lafayette
- 1947 Harps in the Wind
- 1951 Stopover
- 1952 Family Grandstand
- 1953 The Highly Trained Dogs of Professor Petit
- 1953 All I Desire (movie based on Stopover)
- 1955 The Headland
- 1956 Family Sabbatical
- 1959 The Pink Motel
- 1959 Strangers in the Forest
- 1961 The Twin Cities
- 1962 Chateau Saint Barnabe
- 1964 Snow in the River
- 1966 Andy Buckram's Tin Men
- 1968 Two Are Better Than One
- 1968 Winter Cottage
- 1972 The Bad Times of Irma Baumlein [Irma's Big Lie]
- 1974 Louly
- 1976 The Bellini Look
- 1977 Four Girls on a Homestead

=== Plays ===
- 1928 The Cupboard Was Bare
- 1945 Caddie Woodlawn
