= Raymond Woodard Brink =

American mathematician

- Zürich 1932
- Born: January 4, 1890; Newark, New Jersey
- Died: December 27, 1973 (aged 83); La Jolla, California
- Education: Kansas State College; B.S., 1908, B.S.E.E. 1909; Harvard University; Ph.D. 1916
- Spouse(s): Carol Ryrie (1895–1981) (m. 1918–73, his death)
- Children: David R. Brink (b. 1919); Nora Brink Hunter
- Scientific career
- Fields: Mathematics
- Workplaces: University of Minnesota
- Doctoral advisor: George David Birkhoff

Raymond Woodard Brink (4 January 1890 in Newark, New Jersey – 27 December 1973 in La Jolla, California) was an American mathematician. His Ph.D. advisor at Harvard was George David Birkhoff.

Brink entered Kansas State College at age 14 and by age 19 had two bachelor's degrees and was employed as an instructor of mathematics in Moscow, Idaho; he taught at the state preparatory school of the University of Idaho. He returned to school at Harvard and earned a doctorate in 1916 and was a longtime professor at the University of Minnesota, and also authored numerous math textbooks. He served as president of the Mathematical Association of America from 1941–42.

== Personal ==
Brink was the husband of author Carol Ryrie Brink, whom he had met during his first year in Idaho when both were teenagers. She was nearly six years his junior; they wed nine years later in 1918, following her graduation from college. Married for over 55 years at the time of his death, they had two children, David and Nora (Hunter). David (b. 1919) became an attorney and later headed the American Bar Association.
