= Harriet Starr Stewart =

First woman in Canada to earn a BA (1862–1931)

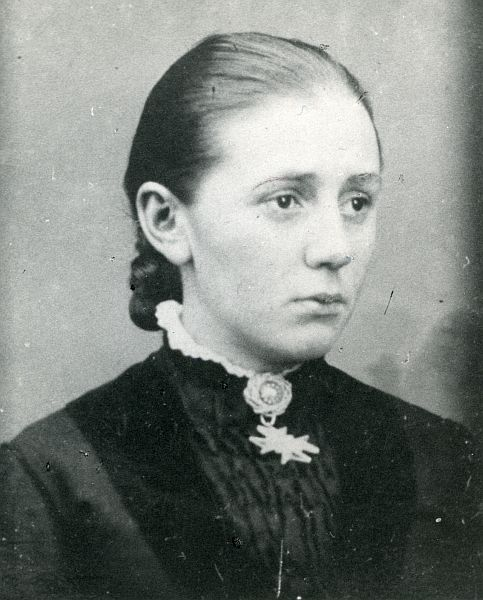
- Stewart c. 1885
- Born: 3 April 1862; Lunenburg, Nova Scotia, British North America (now Canada)
- Died: 1 November 1931 (aged 69); Regina, Saskatchewan, Canada
- Resting place: Sackville Rural Cemetery
- Education: Mount Allison College, BA 1882, MA 1885
- Occupations: Philanthropist; editor

Harriet Starr Stewart (3 April 1862 — 1 November 1931) was a Canadian Methodist philanthropist and editor, known for being the first woman in Canada and the British Empire to earn a Bachelor of Arts.

== Early life and education ==
Stewart was born on 3 April 1862 in Lunenburg, Nova Scotia to Rev Charles Stewart (1827–1910), a Methodist Clergyman, and Harriet Augusta Stewart (née Starr: 1822–1893). Stewart was the third of four siblings.

In 1870, Stewart's father became a professor of theology at Mount Allison College and the family moved to Sackville, New Brunswick. Stewart attended public school in Sackville before enrolling at Mount Allison College in 1878. In 1882, Stewart graduated with a Bachelor of Arts, making her the first women in Canada and the British Empire to do so. Stewart earned her degree seven years after Grace Annie Lockhart, the first woman in the British Empire and in Canada to earn a Bachelor of Science. Unlike Lockhart, Stewart was allowed to participate in the graduation ceremony and to do so wearing academic dress.

Continuing her studies, Stewart was the first women at Mount Allison College to be awarded a Master of Arts in 1885.

== Career ==
Stewart was a charter member of Women's Christian Temperance Union (WCTU). A member of the Women's Missionary Society of the Methodist Church, Stewart served on the society's Dominion Board and was the editor of the society's publication The Palm Branch.

Following the death of her sister-in-law in 1917, Stewart moved to Regina in order to help raise her younger brother's children. In Regina, Stewart continued her work with Women's Missionary Society and served as the president of the auxiliary, vice-president of the Saskatchewan branch, and representative to the Dominion Board.

== Personal life ==
On 1 November 1931, Stewart died in Regina aged 69. Stewart was buried at Sackville Rural Cemetery.
