= Mary Mellish (educator) =

Canadian educator

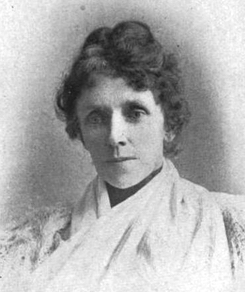
- Mary Mellish Archibald, from a 1905 publication.
- Born: 27 January 1849; Pownal, Prince Edward Island, British North America
- Died: 9 January 1901 (aged 51); New York City, New York, U.S.
- Other names: Mary Mellish Archibald
- Occupations: Educator, writer
- Children: Raymond Clare Archibald

Mary Mellish (27 January 1849 – 9 January 1901), later Mary Mellish Archibald, was an educator from Prince Edward Island, best known for her long association with women's education at Mount Allison University in Sackville, New Brunswick.

== Early life ==
Mary Mellish was born in Pownal, Prince Edward Island, the daughter of James Lewis Mellish and Margaret Sophia Murray. She trained as a teacher at the normal school in Charlottetown. She earned her teaching licence in 1864. For the next five years she taught intermittently and worked for a time as a governess. She pursued further studies at Mount Allison Wesleyan Academy, Female Branch, in Sackville, New Brunswick. and graduated in 1867 with a Mistress of Liberal Arts diploma (MLA).

== Career ==
Mellish served as teacher and Preceptress of the Mount Allison Wesleyan Female Academy, from 1869 to 1873. She left the classroom to marry, but returned to teaching when she became a widow in 1883 and sole supporter of her young son. She resumed her position as Preceptress at the Mount Allison Ladies' Academy in 1885, and stayed at Sackville for sixteen years, working with Principal Byron Crane Borden to improve the school.

Beyond her school leadership work, Mellish was active in temperance work and other Methodist Church activities.

== Personal life and legacy ==
Mary Mellish married fellow educator Abram Newcomb Archibald in 1874. They had a son, Raymond Clare Archibald (1875-1955), who became a noted mathematician and historian of mathematics. Abram Archibald died from typhoid in 1883. Mary Mellish Archibald died from pneumonia in January 1901 in New York City, at age 51.

The Mary Mellish Archibald Library of Folklore at Mount Allison University was begun by her son in 1905, as a memorial gift to the school.
