= Grace Annie Lockhart =

First women in Canada to earn a BS (1855–1916)

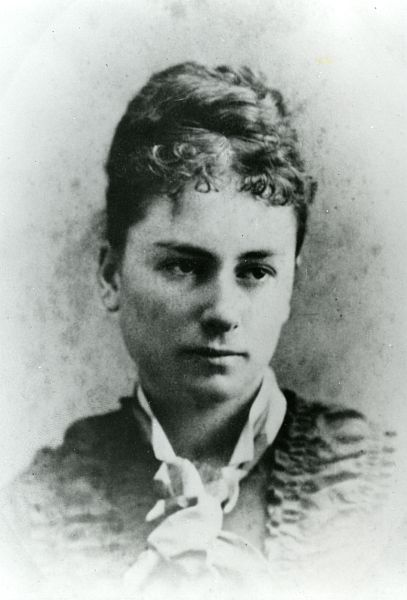
- Lockhart in 1875
- Born: 22 February 1855; Saint John, Newfoundland Colony
- Died: 18 May 1916 (aged 61); Charlottetown, Prince Edward Island, Canada
- Resting place: Tryon People’s Cemetery
- Other name: Grace Annie Dawson
- Education: Mount Allison Ladies’ College, MLA, 1874; Mount Allison College, BS, 1875
- Occupations: Teacher; women’s rights advocate
- Known for: First women in Canada and the British Empire to earn a BS
- Spouse: John Leard Dawson (m. 1881)
- Children: 3

Grace Annie Lockhart (married name Dawson; 22 February 1855 – 18 May 1916) was a Canadian teacher and women’s rights advocate, known for being the first women in Canada and the British Empire to earn a Bachelor of Science.

== Early life and education ==
Lockhart was born on 22 February 1855 in Saint John, New Brunswick to Edward Elias Lockhart (1819–1897) and Susan Lockhart (née Whittekir; c. 1824–1855). The youngest of four sisters in an upper middle-class family, Lockhart's mother died 9 months after she was born. Lockhart was subsequently raised by families' housekeeper Rosanna Wilson (died 1863), who became her surrogate mother, and by her older sisters.

In 1866, Lockhart's eldest sister enrolled at Mount Allison Ladies’ College, with her other sisters later enrolling in 1868. None of her sisters completed their studies, despite the family having the money to allow them to do so. In 1871, Lockhart enrolled at Mount Allison Ladies’ College and in 1874 obtained her Mistress of Liberal Arts (MLA), the equivalent of two years of university study. In 1872, Lockhart enrolled at Mount Allison College and earned her Bachelor of Science in 1875, making her the first women in Canada and the British Empire to do so. Until like her male counterparts, Lockhart has not allowed to wear academic dress during graduation.

== Career ==
In 1878, began teaching English and history at Mount Allison College. Lockhart later taught at public schools in New Brunswick until her marriage. In 1881, Lockhart married John Leard Dawson, a Methodist minister and fellow classmate at Mount Allison College. The Methodist circuit system meant that the couple moved to a new congregation every three years.

Lockhart was a member of the Woman’s Christian Temperance Union, supported access to higher education for women and supported women's suffrage. In 1991, Lockhart was named a National Historic Person.

== Personal life ==
Lockhart and Dawson had three children.

On 18 May 1916 Lockhart died in Charlottetown, Prince Edward Island, aged 61. Lockhart was buried at Tryon People’s Cemetery in Tryon, Prince Edward Island.

== See also ==
- Harriet Starr Stewart, the first woman in Canada and the British Empire to earn a Bachelor of Arts.
