= Benjamin Finkel =

American mathematician (1865–1947)

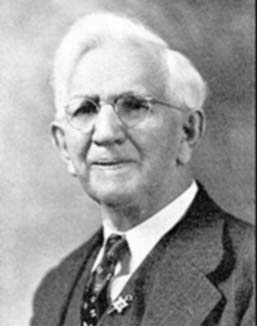
- Born: Benjamin Franklin Finkel; July 5, 1865; Amanda, Ohio, U.S.
- Died: February 5, 1947 (aged 81); Springfield, Missouri, U.S.
- Education: Ohio Normal University (BSc, MSc) University of Pennsylvania (MSc, PhD)
- Known for: Founding The American Mathematical Monthly
- Scientific career
- Fields: Mathematics
- Workplaces: Drury College
- Thesis: Determination of All Groups of Order 2 M which Contain Self-conjugate Sub-groups of Order 2 M-4 and Whose Generating Operations Correspond to the Partitions (m-4, 4),(m-4, 3, 1) (1906)

Benjamin Franklin Finkel (born Benjamin Franklin Finckel) (July 5, 1865 – February 5, 1947) was a mathematician and educator most remembered today as the founder of the American Mathematical Monthly magazine.

== Life ==
Born in Fairfield County, Ohio and educated in small country schools, Finkel received both bachelor's and master's degrees from Ohio Northern University, then known as Ohio Normal University (1888 and 1891, respectively).

In 1888 he copyrighted A Mathematical Solution Book. The purpose of the book was to provide mathematics teachers a text utilizing a systematic method of problem solving, "The Step Method", representing a chain of reasoning, in logical order, to arrive at the correct result. The first edition was postponed until 1893, due to financial problems of the original publisher. The book's preface stated that the work was based upon eight years of teaching in the public schools. Following editions were published in 1897, 1899 and 1902.

In 1895 he became professor of mathematics and physics at Drury University, then known as Drury College. He was a University Scholar in Mathematics at the University of Chicago from 1895–1896. In 1906 he was awarded a doctorate from the University of Pennsylvania, where he had earlier earned an additional master's degree in 1904 and a Harrison fellow appointment in 1905.

He was a member of the American Mathematical Society, 1891; the London Mathematical Society, 1898; and Circolo Matematico di Palermo, 1902. He retained his professorship at Drury College until his death in 1947.
