= Mount Allison University =

Liberal arts university in Sackville, New Brunswick, Canada

- Motto: Litterae, Religio, Scientia
- Motto in English: Writing, Divinity, Knowledge
- Type: Public liberal arts university
- Established: June 1839; 187 years ago
- Religious affiliation: United Church of Canada
- Academic affiliations: Maple League of Universities, Universities Canada, IAU, ACU, CIS, CBIE, AUS, CUP
- Endowment: $303.7 million (2026)
- Chancellor: George L. Cooper, KC
- President: Ian Sutherland
- Faculty: 129
- Students: 2,556 (Fall 2026)
- Undergraduates: 2,541
- Postgraduates: 15
- Location: Sackville, New Brunswick, Canada; 45°53′55″N 64°22′25″W
- Campus: College Town, 72 acres (29 ha)
- Colours: Garnet & gold
- Nickname: Mounties
- Sporting affiliations: U Sports - AUS; CCAA - ACAA
- Website: mta.ca

Mount Allison University (also Mount A or MtA), founded in 1839, is a public primarily undergraduate liberal arts university located in Sackville, New Brunswick, Canada.

Mount Allison was the first university in the British Empire to award a baccalaureate to a woman (Grace Annie Lockhart, B.Sc., 1875). It was also the first university in Canada to grant a bachelor of arts to a woman (Harriet Starr Stewart in 1882).

Graduates of Mount Allison have been awarded a total of 57 Rhodes Scholarships, the highest per capita of any university in the British Commonwealth.

It is ranked the top undergraduate university in Canada for a record 26th time, by Maclean's 2026 Annual University Ranking.

== History ==
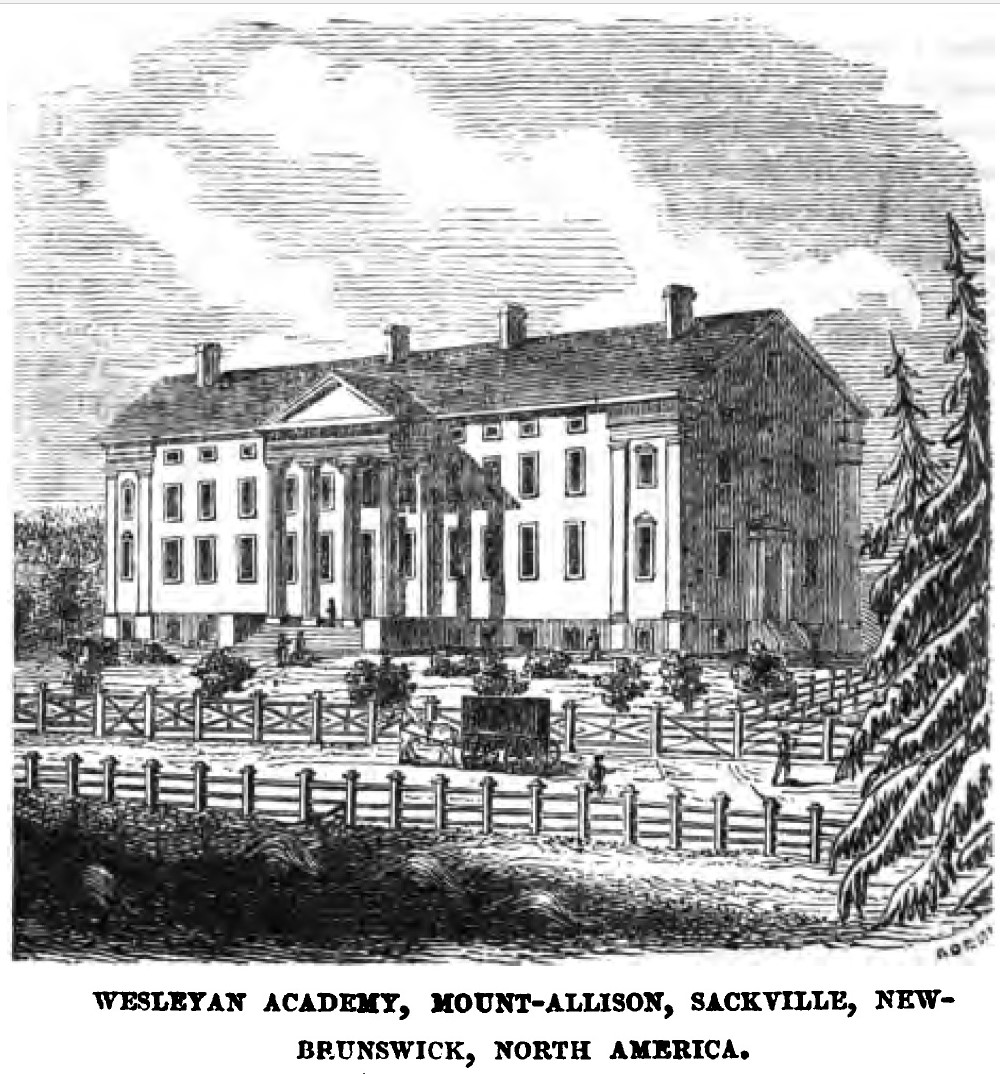
Wesleyan Academy, Mount-Allison, Sackville, New-Brunswick, North America (1852)

Mount Allison traces its roots to 1839 when a Sackville merchant proposed the creation of a school of elementary and higher learning. The university is a secular (but United Church-affiliated) primarily undergraduate liberal arts university, with classes beginning in Sackville, New Brunswick, on January 19, 1843. Mount Allison was named after Charles Frederick Allison, in honour of his gift of land and money. Its origins were steeped in the Methodist faith and it was designed to prepare men for the ministry and to supply education for lay members. The university was chartered on April 14, 1849.

In June 1839, Charles Allison was encouraged by Wesleyan Methodist minister Rev. John Bass Strong that a school of elementary and higher learning be built. Allison offered to purchase a site in Sackville to erect a suitable building for an academy and to contribute operating funds of £100 a year for 10 years. This offer was accepted and the Wesleyan Academy for boys subsequently opened in 1843.

In 1854, a women's institution (later known as the "Ladies College") was opened to complement the boys' academy. In 1858 an act of the New Brunswick Legislature authorized the trustees to establish a degree-conferring institution at Sackville, under the name of the Mount Allison Wesleyan College.

In July 1862, the degree-granting Mount Allison College was organized. The first two students, Howard Sprague and Josiah Wood, graduated in May 1863.

For nearly a century, Mount Allison functioned as three distinct, mutually enriching parts: the college proper, the Boys' Academy, and the Ladies College. The corporate name was changed to University of Mount Allison College in 1886.

The university's affiliation was transferred to the United Church of Canada following church union in 1925. Original components of the university included: the Mount Allison Wesleyan Academy for Boys (1840–1958), the Ladies' College (1854–1958), and Mount Allison College. Mount Allison College was established in 1862 with degree-granting powers on behalf of the other two.

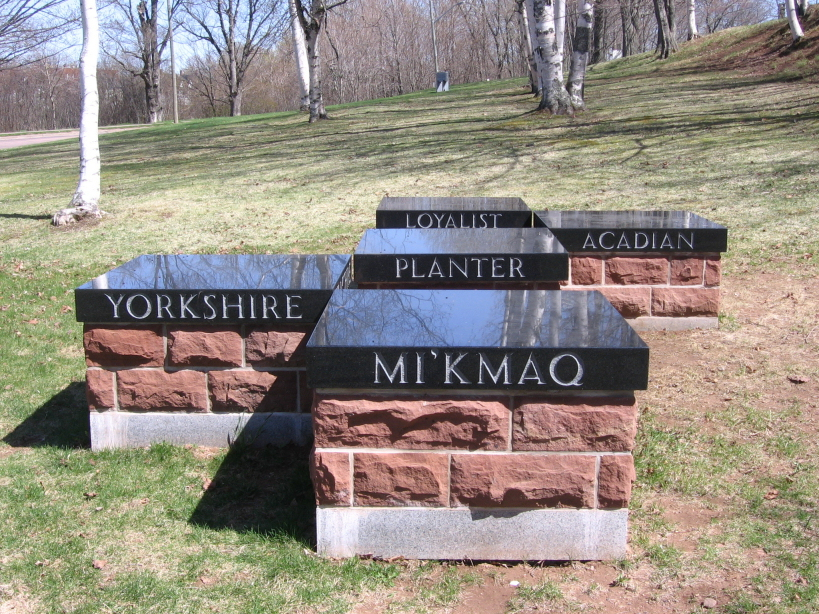
The Sackville founders monument commemorates Sackville's incorporation and its founding peoples. It was installed on the campus of Mount Allison University in 2003.

The governance followed the University of Toronto Act of 1906, establishing a bicameral system with a senate managing academic policy and a board of governors overseeing financial policy and holding authority in other areas. The president, appointed by the board, served as the link between the two bodies and provided institutional leadership.

By 1920, Mount Allison University had three faculties: Arts, Theology, and Engineering. It awarded the degrees of Bachelor of Arts (BA), Bachelor of Science (BSc), Bachelor of Divinity (BD), and Master of Arts. It had 246 male students and 73 female students, as well as 28 academic staff, all male.

In 1941, Mount Allison was the first university in Canada to offer a Bachelor of Fine Arts (BFA) degree in visual arts, however the teaching of art at Mount Allison can be traced back to the opening of the Women's Academy in 1854.

The closure of the School for Girls in 1946 and the Boy's Academy in 1953 provided space for Mount Allison University's expansion. In 1958, construction and building acquisitions eased overcrowding. The university reaffirmed its focus on high-quality undergraduate liberal arts education and existing professional programs, opting not to pursue new professional or post-graduate courses.

The policy of university education initiated in the 1960s responded to population pressure and the belief that higher education was a key to social justice and economic productivity for individuals and for society. Mount Allison University was established by the Mount Allison University Act, 1993.

Mount Allison University's arms and badge were registered with the Canadian Heraldic Authority on November 15, 2007.

Notable professors at Mount Allison include George Stanley, who designed the Canadian flag, known as the "Maple Leaf". Inspired by the Royal Military College of Canada's flag, Stanley's design was chosen and officially adopted on February 15, 1965, now celebrated as National Flag of Canada Day. Artist Alex Colville became a faculty member in Fine Arts at Mount Allison, where he taught painting from 1946 to 1963. American chemist James B. Sumner, who won the 1946 Nobel Prize in Chemistry, taught and performed research at Mount Allison as a teaching fellow from 1910 to 1911.

== Academics ==
University rankings

World rankings

Canadian rankings
- Maclean's Undergraduate: 1
- Maclean's Reputation: 1

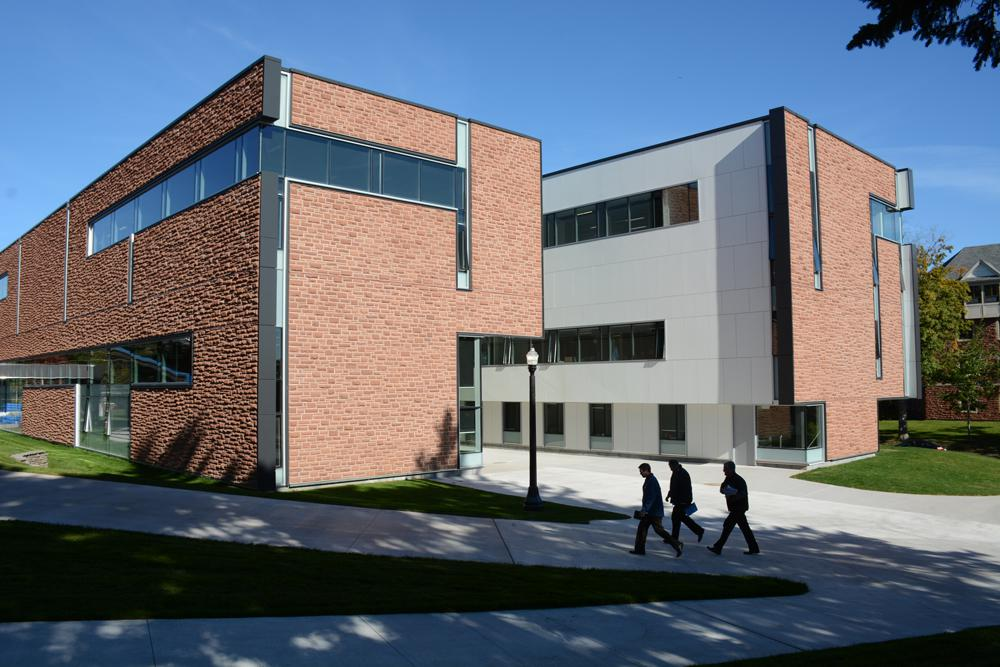
Purdy Crawford Centre for the Arts

The mission statement of Mount Allison University promotes "the creation and dissemination of knowledge in a community of higher learning, centred on the undergraduate student and delivered in an intimate and harmonious environment". Mount Allison currently offers bachelor's degrees in arts, science, commerce, fine arts, and music, as well as master's degrees in biology and chemistry and biochemistry, and certificates in bilingualism. A Bachelor's degree in Science, Arts or Commerce with a major in Aviation has been developed in conjunction with the Moncton Flight College.

The university's enrolment was 2,288 full-time students plus 91 part-time students in Fall 2021.

== Architecture ==
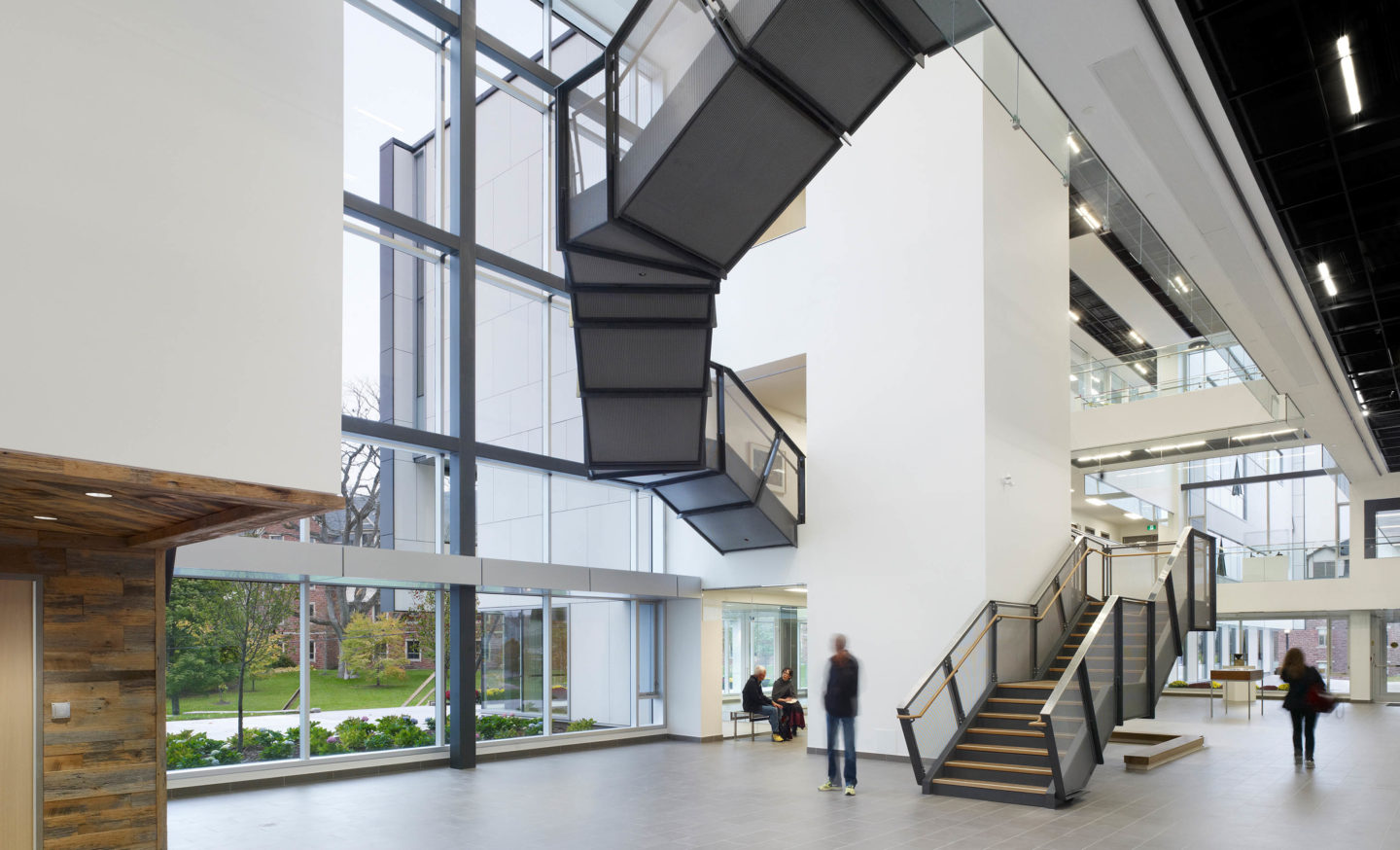
Purdy Crawford Centre for the Arts atrium

Mount Allison's campus is distinguished by its architecture, characterized by the distinctive red and olive sandstone that clads most of the buildings. The more prominent red sandstone was largely quarried in Sackville at the Pickard quarry, which was owned by the university from 1930 until it was sold to the Town of Sackville in 2022.

In most cases, the present campus is much newer than the age of the institution, which was founded in the mid-19th century. At that time, the original Mount Allison buildings were wooden clapboarded structures all painted white. Succumbing to fires or demolition, these earlier buildings have been replaced with brick or stone structures, although a unique and significant instance of early Mount Allison wooden architecture survives at the centre of campus: the President's Cottage of 1857.

Noted architectural historian, John Leroux, who is working with visual artist Thaddeus Holownia on a book about the university's architecture, calls the campus "one of the finest in Canada" and says some of the most beautiful buildings built in New Brunswick in the last 100 years are located at Mount Allison.

In particular, Leroux names the Mount Allison chapel as one of the most significant buildings in the province, saying, "It is exquisite. It is nearly a perfect building." The chapel is a masterwork of the Ontario-based architecture firm of Brown, Brisley and Brown, who designed numerous new buildings and transformed the site configuration of Mount Allison in the mid- to late-1960s and early 1970s into the landscape it is today. Paramount of their scheme was the creation of the central courtyard with the chapel as a focus at one end, and the Library's gateway colonnade overlooking the town and Convocation Hall at the other. Among the other Brown, Brisley and Brown buildings completed at Mount Allison between 1964 and 1980 are: the Gairdner Fine Arts Building, the Marjorie Young Bell Conservatory of Music, the Barclay Chemistry Building, Edwards House, Thornton House, the Ralph Pickard Bell Library, and the Harold Crabtree Building.

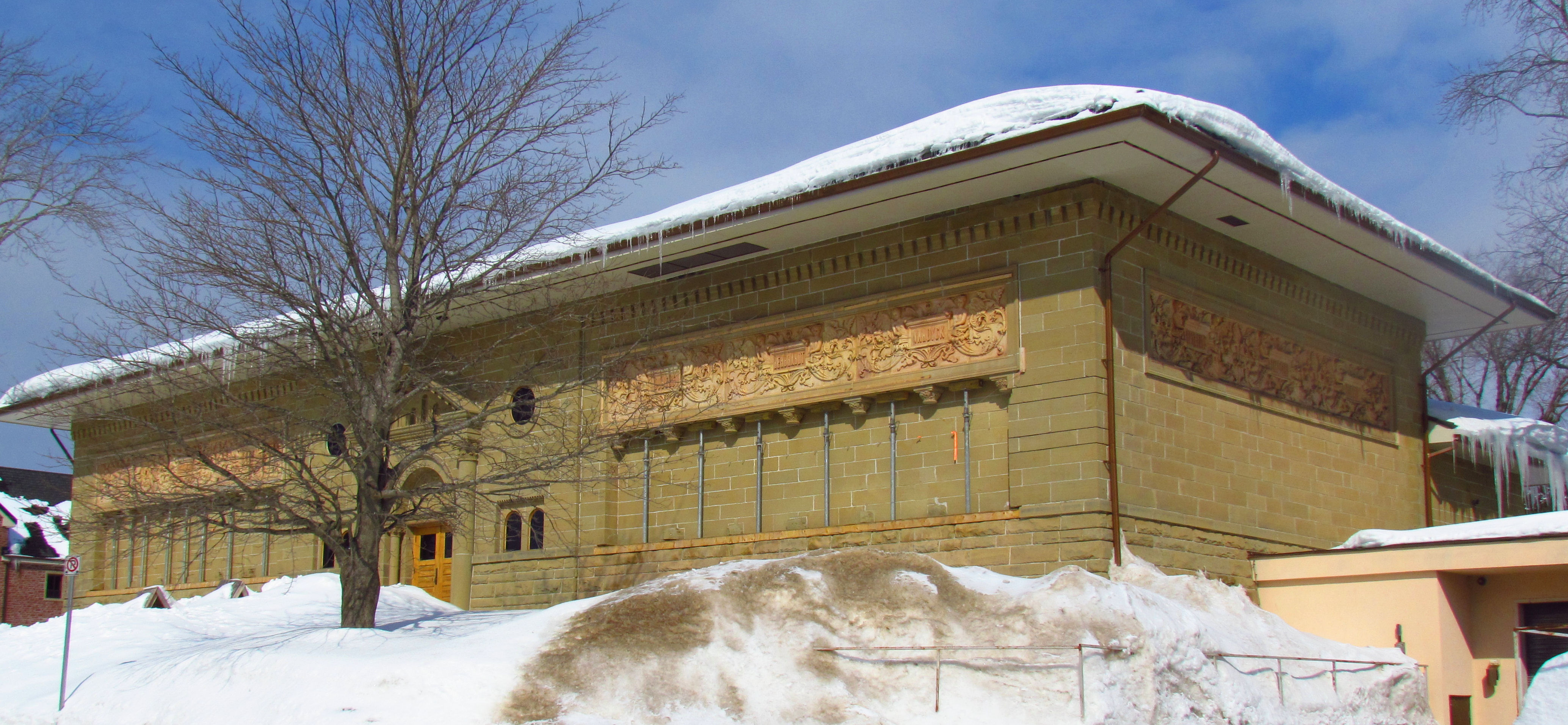
Owens Art Gallery

Other significant buildings are the Owens Art Gallery, the oldest university art gallery in Canada, which opened in 1895, and Hammond House, the only registered National Historic Site in the Town of Sackville. Both were designed by noted Toronto architect Edmund Burke. The Queen Anne Revival-style Hammond House was originally built for Canadian artist and head of the Fine Arts department John Hammond in 1896. It now serves as the President's residence.

Several campus buildings were designed by architect Andrew R. Cobb, including the Memorial Library (1926–27; demol. 2011), Flemington Building (1930–31), and Centennial Hall (1883–84, but redesigned by Cobb in 1933 after the original was gutted by fire).

The Memorial Library (renamed University Centre in 1970) was constructed in the Tudor-inspired Gothic Revival style. The library also included a set of plaques, now located on the ground floor atrium of the Wallace McCain Student Centre, which are listed in the Canadian Forces' National Inventory of Canadian Military Memorials – No. 13002-004. The plaques list the names of Allisonians who died at war. Every year since 1927, the names of each of the fallen are read aloud during the university's annual Remembrance Day service.

The Wallace McCain Student Centre, originally constructed as a men's residence (Trueman House) in 1945 and designed by Halifax architect C.A. Fowler, was gutted and repurposed in 2008, keeping the exterior form and stone walls intact.

The newest building on campus is the Purdy Crawford Centre for the Arts, which opened in 2014. Housing the Pierre Lassonde School of Fine Arts and the department of drama, the building features art studios, a large atrium, and the 100-seat Motyer-Fancy Theatre. Designed by the internationally honoured Canadian architecture firm Zeidler Partnership, it was featured in Canadian Architect magazine in March 2015.

== Social life ==
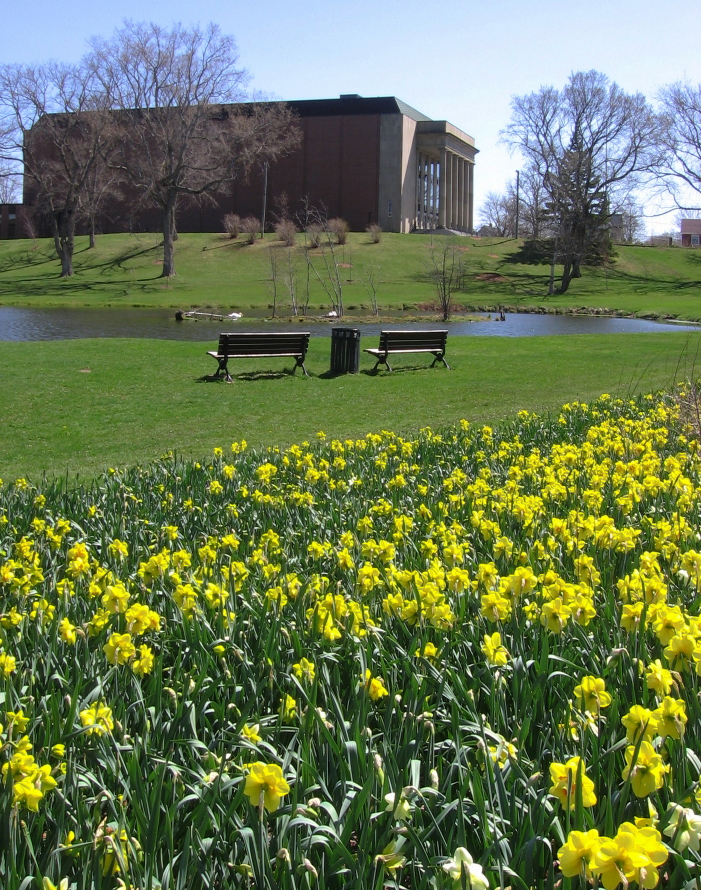
Springtime in Sackville – a view of Convocation Hall from the swan pond, Mount Allison University.

Social life at Mount Allison tends to focus on extracurricular activities: there are 140 clubs and societies and over 30 varsity, club, and intramural sports teams.

A dorm room at Campbell Hall, Mt. Allison University

Mount Allison's campus paper, The Argosy, is an independent publication produced weekly. The publication dates from 1872, making it one of the oldest student publications in the country. The campus and community radio station, CHMA 106.9 FM, is owned and operated by the members of Attic Broadcasting Company Ltd., a non-profit organization with its offices on the university campus.

== Student government ==
The Mount Allison Students' Union (MASU) represents all full- and part-time students at Mount Allison. It operates as a membership-based non-profit corporation and was incorporated in 1980 under the New Brunswick Companies Act.

== Administration ==
Mount Allison University 107726820RR0001 was registered as a charitable organization in Canada on January 1, 1967. The primary areas in which the charity is now carrying on programs to achieve its charitable purposes, ranked according to the percentage of time and resources devoted to each program area follow:

- Universities and colleges 97%
- Scholarships, bursaries, awards 3%

The charity carried on charitable programs to further its charitable purpose(s) (as defined in its governing documents) this fiscal period:

- Provides rigorous liberal education primarily to undergraduate students in a co-educational intimate residential environment.
- Provides scholarships, bursaries and awards to students.

== Labour relations ==
Mount Allison faculty are represented by the Mount Allison Faculty Association, and the staff by CUPE local 3433 and CUPE local 2338. Mount Allison had a three-week long faculty strike in early 2014. Students sought a refund for tuition following the strike, a request that was denied by the board of regents. Mount Allison had another six-day faculty strike in February 2020.

== Athletics ==
The school's team name in Canadian Interuniversity Sport (CIS) is the Mount Allison Mounties. The football team has appeared in the Vanier Cup national college football championship game twice (1984 & 1991). The Mount Allison football team also made playoff appearances in 2007, 2008, 2010, 2013, and 2014. The team won the 2013 AUS championship, but lost to the Laval Rouge et Or in the Uteck Bowl (the national college football semi final) and in 2014, losing to McMaster in the Mitchell Bowl.

Mount Allison is also home to a CIS-level women's hockey team, as well as swim, badminton, and soccer teams. Basketball and volleyball teams compete against colleges and other smaller universities.

Mount Allison is the winner of the first ever ACAA men's rugby championship in 2007 and remained undefeated through 2010, resulting in four consecutive championships. In both 2008 and 2009, the men's and women's Mounties remained undefeated throughout the regular season and became ACAA champions. The Men's Rugby Club has won the B side Rugby Championship in 2023, 2024 and, 2025, marking a three-peat in the teams history. The team also competed in the Atlantic Men's University Rugby League Division A side for the first time in 2025, in an exhibition status.

The university women's hockey team plays at the Tantramar Civic Centre.

== Arms ==
Coat of arms of the Mount Allison University
| Notes Granted 15 November 2007 Crest Issuant from a circlet of maple leaves Or a dexter cubit arm Proper holding a torch Murrey enflamed Proper. Escutcheon Murrey three open books Proper edged and clasped Or the first inscribed LITTERAE the second RELIGIO and the third SCIENTIA in letters Sable all within a bordure Or. Supporters Issuing from three fleurs-de-lis in fess Azure a demi-lion Argent armed langued and crowned with an antique crown Or holding in the dexter paw a parchment scroll Argent bound Azure. Motto Litterae Religio Scientia (Letters Religion Knowledge) |

== Notable alumni ==
- Robert Barritt, Bermudian painter and politician
- Kate Beaton, cartoonist
- Louise Belcourt, artist
- Marc Bell, cartoonist
- Winthrop Pickard Bell, historian and philosopher
- Rick Black, CFL football player, Grey Cup champion
- Tricia Black, actress, comedian
- Harold Lothrop Borden, military officer
- John Bragg, industrialist
- Kate Braid, poet
- Charles Tory Bruce, poet, writer, and journalist
- Harry Bruce, writer and journalist
- John Buchanan, Premier of Nova Scotia, senator
- Henry Burr, entertainer
- Catherine Callbeck, Premier of Prince Edward Island and businesswoman
- David W. Chappell, professor of Chinese religion, University of Hawaiʻi
- Herménégilde Chiasson, Lieutenant-Governor of New Brunswick
- Erminie Cohen, Senator
- Suzanne Cowan, Former President of the Liberal Party of Canada
- Alex Colville, artist
- Marilyn Trenholme Counsell, physician, Senator, Lieutenant Governor of New Brunswick
- Purdy Crawford, lawyer, business executive, philanthropist
- Frank Parker Day, author, educator, president of Union College (NY), 1929–1933
- Michael de Adder, cartoonist
- James M. Dickson, Queen's Counsel, jurist and business leader
- Muriel McQueen Fergusson, senator
- Aida McAnn Flemming, educator, animal welfare advocate
- Daniel Gaudet, Olympic gymnast
- Heward Grafftey, politician and businessman
- John James Grant, Lieutenant Governor of Nova Scotia
- John Gray, playwright
- Anna Greenwood-Lee, Anglican bishop
- Don Hannah, playwright and novelist
- Ian Hanomansing, journalist
- Brent Hawkes, LGBT rights activist and minister
- Sheila A. Hellstrom, first woman Regular Force member to achieve the rank of Brigadier-General
- Bonnie Henry, first female Provincial Health Officer for British Columbia (2018-)
- John Peters Humphrey, jurist
- Jimmy Kempe, Bermudian Olympic sailor (1923–2018)
- Greg Kerr, former Member of Parliament for West Nova
- Eric Lapointe, CFL football player, Hec Crighton Trophy winner
- Leslie M. Little, justice of the federal Tax Court of Canada
- Max Liboiron, environmental artist and scientist, professor of geography, Memorial University of Newfoundland
- Grace Annie Lockhart, first woman in the British Empire to receive a bachelor's degree
- Peter Loewen, Harold Tanner Dean of the College of Arts and Sciences, Cornell University
- Kevin G. Lynch, Vice-chair, BMO Financial Group
- Mary Florence MacDonald, curator
- Angus MacLean, Premier of Prince Edward Island
- J. Michael MacDonald, Chief Justice of Nova Scotia
- John Main, 7th Premier of Nunavut
- Margaret McCain, Lieutenant-Governor of New Brunswick
- Wallace McCain, industrialist
- Abner Reid McClelan, 10th Lieutenant-Governor of New Brunswick
- Mary Mellish, educator
- Moses Morgan, academic
- Arthur Motyer, playwright, novelist, professor emeritus
- David Myles, singer-songwriter
- Christopher Pratt, artist
- Mary Pratt, artist
- Watson Elkinah Reid, architect Hotel del Coronado
- Ivan Rand, jurist
- John Henry Reardon, actor
- Rachel Reid, author, Game Changers book series Heated Rivalry
- Edgar Ritchie, Canadian Ambassador to the United States (1966–1970) and Ireland (1976–1980)
- Brenda Mary Robertson, first female in the New Brunswick Legislature
- Alison Sealy-Smith, actor and founding director of Obsidian Theatre
- Sir Cuthbert Sebastian, Governor-General of Saint Kitts and Nevis
- Scott Simms, former Member of Parliament for Bonavista—Gander—Grand Falls—Windsor
- Nan Macpherson Smith (d. 1940) leader in women's activities, as well patriotic, philanthropic, cultural, missionary, and benevolent projects
- John Clarence Webster, physician and historian
- Robert Winters, politician
- Lucas Cormier, CFL football player

== See also ==
- Higher education in New Brunswick
- List of universities in New Brunswick
- Canadian Interuniversity Sport
- Canadian government scientific research organizations
- Canadian university scientific research organizations
- Canadian industrial research and development organizations
