= Aubrey J. Kempner =

English-born American mathematician

Aubrey John Kempner (22 September 1880, in Greater London, England – 18 November 1973, in Boulder, Colorado) was an English-born American mathematician, known for the Kempner function and the Kempner series.

Aubrey Kempner received in 1911 his PhD with the dissertation Über das Waringsche Problem und einige Verallgemeinerungen under Edmund Landau at the University of Göttingen. He then went to the US and taught at the University of Illinois and from 1925 at the University of Colorado at Boulder, where he remained until 1949 and from 1944 to 1949 was chair of the mathematics department. From 1950 he also taught at the Colorado School of Medicine and at the National Institute of Standards and Technology in Boulder.

Kempner's research was mainly in number theory and the theory of calculating the center of mass of a region defined by polynomial equations. In his honor the mathematics faculty of the University of Colorado at Boulder established the Kempner Colloquium. In the years 1937 and 1938 he was president of the Mathematical Association of America.

== Publications ==
- Kempner, Aubrey J. (1916). "On transcendental numbers". Trans. Amer. Math. Soc. 17 (4): 476–482. doi:10.1090/s0002-9947-1916-1501054-4. MR 1501054.
- Kempner, A. J. (1935). "On the complex roots of algebraic equations". Bull. Amer. Math. Soc. 41 (12): 809–843. doi:10.1090/s0002-9904-1935-06201-9. MR 1563200.
- Paradoxes and common sense (pamphlet; 22 pages). Van Nostrand. 1959.
