= Earle Raymond Hedrick =

American mathematician (1876–1943)

2nd Provost of the University of California, Los Angeles
- In office 1937–1942
- Preceded by: Ernest Carroll Moore
- Succeeded by: Clarence Addison Dykstra

Personal details
- Born: 27 September 1876 Union City, Indiana, US
- Died: 3 February 1943 (aged 66) Providence, Rhode Island, US
- Relatives: Carey McWilliams (son-in-law)
- Education: University of Michigan (BA); Harvard University (MA); Göttingen University (PhD)
- Occupation: University Professor; University Provost

Earle Raymond Hedrick (September 27, 1876 – February 3, 1943), was an American mathematician and a vice-president of the University of California.

== Education and career ==
Hedrick was born in Union City, Indiana. After undergraduate work at the University of Michigan, he obtained a Master of Arts from Harvard University. With a Parker fellowship, he went to Europe and obtained his PhD from Göttingen University in Germany under the supervision of David Hilbert in 1901. He then spent several months at the École Normale Supérieure in France, where he became acquainted with Édouard Goursat, Jacques Hadamard, Jules Tannery, Émile Picard and Paul Émile Appell, before becoming an instructor at Yale University. In 1903, he became professor at the University of Missouri.

He moved in 1920 to the University of California, Los Angeles to become head of the department of mathematics. In 1933, he was giving the first graduate lecture on mathematics at UCLA. He became provost and vice-president of the University of California in 1937. He humorously called his appointment The Accident, and told jokingly after this event, "I no longer have any intellectual interests —I just sit and talk to people." He played in fact a very important role in making of the University of California a leading institution. He retired from the UCLA faculty in 1942 and accepted a visiting professorship at Brown University. Soon after the beginning of this new appointment, he suffered a lung infection. He died at the Rhode Island Hospital in Providence, Rhode Island. Two UCLA residence halls have been named after him: Hedrick Hall in 1963, and Hedrick Summit in 2005.

== Research ==
Earle Raymond Hedrick worked on partial differential equations and on the theory of non-analytic functions of complex variables. He also did work in applied mathematics, in particular on a generalization of Hooke's law and on transmission of heat in steam boilers. With Oliver Dimon Kellogg he authored a text on the applications of calculus to mechanics.

== Pedagogical activity ==
Earle Raymond Hedrick translated in English the Cours d'Analyse of Édouard Goursat providing American students with an up-to-date (for the beginning of the twentieth century) textbook of analysis. He also translated the first part of the textbook of Felix Klein Elementarmathematik vom höheren Standpunkte aus in English. His activity in the Mathematical Association of America and in the National Council of Mathematics Teachers had also an important impact on mathematics education in the United States. He also authored or co-authored various textbooks of mathematics, and was general editor of the Series of Mathematical Texts which comprises about 40 volumes.

== Administrative activities ==
Earle Raymond Hedrick was involved in the creation of the Mathematical Association of America in 1916 and was its first president. The Earle Raymond Hedrick lectures were established by the Mathematical Association in America in his honor. He also served as vice-president of the American Association for the Advancement of Science, and played an important role at the American Mathematical Society both as president (1929–1930) and as editor of the Bulletin of the Americal Mathematical Society, a role he assumed during 17 years. He also worked as editor for the Engineering Science Series.

== Professional societies ==
Besides the societies where Earl Raymond Hedrick had important administrative activities, he was also a member of:

- Society for the Promotion of Electrical Engineering
- American Society of Mechanical Engineers
- American Institute of Electrical Engineers

== Textbooks ==
- Applications of the calculus to mechanics with Oliver Dimon Kellogg (Boston: Ginn, 1909)
- Solid Geometry with Walter Burton Ford and Charles Ammerman (New York: Macmillan, 1913)
- Analytic geometry and principles of algebra with Alexander Ziwet (New York: Macmillan, 1913)
- Constructive geometry; exercises in elementary geometric drawing (New York : Macmillan, 1916)
- Logarithmic and trigonometric tables (New York : Macmillan, 1920)
