= Edward W. Packel =

Edward Wesler Packel (born July 23, 1941) is an American mathematician, game theorist, theoretical computer scientist, and expert on the use of Wolfram Mathematica in teaching mathematics. His 1981 book The Mathematics of Games and Gambling won the 1986 Beckenbach Book Prize.

== Early life and education ==
Edward W. Packel was born on July 23, 1941 in Philadelphia, Pennsylvania. His parents were Israel Packel (1907–1987, a lawyer, jurist and attorney general of Pennsylvania) and Reba Wesler Packel (1909–1995), who had three sons and no daughters. In 1959 Edward Packel matriculated at Amherst College and graduated there in 1963 with a B.A. in mathematics. At Amherst, he played soccer. In autumn 1963 he became a graduate student at Massachusetts Institute of Technology (M.I.T.), where he graduated in 1967 with a Ph.D. in mathematics. His Ph.D. thesis Some Results on (C_{0}) Semigroups and the Cauchy Problem was supervised by Gilbert Strang.

== Career ==
From 1967 to 1971 Packel was an assistant professor of mathematics at Reed College. As a mathematician on the staff of the Chicago metropolitan area's Lake Forest College, he was an assistant professor from 1971 to 1975, an associate professor from 1975 to 1982, and a full professor from 1982 until his retirement as professor emeritus in 2013. At Lake Forest College, he was director of the computer center from 1972 to 1973 and chair of the department of mathematics and computer science department from 1986 to 1996. At Columbia University he held a part-time appointment as a senior lecturer in computer science from 1983 to 1985. He is the author or co-author of several books and more than 35 refereed articles.

Packel was a visiting associate at California Institute of Technology (Caltech) for the academic year 1977–1978 and again in spring 1980. He held appointments a visiting professor for the academic year 1989–1990 at Berkeley's Mathematical Sciences Research Institute (MSRI), for the academic year 1996–1997 at Australia's University of Sydney, and in autumn 2003 at Harvey Mudd College in Claremont, California. As a consultant, he has taught courses in Mathematica for Wolfram Research, conducted workshops for the Rocky Mountain Mathematics Consortium on consulting for business, and worked on various consultations related to topics related to gambling. His consulting activities related to gambling include probability calculations and computer simulations for new games involving chance, aspects of slot machine developments, and project management for machines that play poker against people.

== Personal life and avocations ==
In May 1968, Edward Packel married Doreen Humphreys. They divorced in 1979 after becoming the parents of three daughters, Amanda, Laura, and Lisa. Laura Packel became an epidemiologist and expert in family planning and reproductive health. In July 1980 Edward Packel married Kathryn Helen Dohrmann, whose father was a Lutheran pastor. There is a son Adrian from Edward Packel's second marriage. At Lake Forest College, Kathryn Dohrmann is an assistant professor of psychology, emerita.

Edward Packel helped to establish the Lake Forest/Lake Bluff Running Club, where he and his wife Kathryn participated together in running. In 2001, Edward set a new record time in the mile run for Illinois runners in his age group. He also enjoys golf — in August 2005 he won $180 at the Lake County Senior Invitational at Lake Bluff Golf Club.

In 2025 Ed Packel was inducted into the Lake Forest College Fan Club Hall of Fame as part of the 50 year celebration of his soccer coaching successes (1975) and other contributions to LFC.

=== Articles ===
- Packel, E. W. (1974). "Hilbert Space Operators and Quantum Mechanics". The American Mathematical Monthly. 81 (8): 863–873. doi:10.1080/00029890.1974.11993680.
- Deegan, J.; Packel, E. W. (1978). "A new index of power for simple n-person games". International Journal of Game Theory. 7 (2): 113–123. doi:10.1007/BF01753239. S2CID 123081028.
- Packel, Edward W.; Deegan, John (1980). "An axiomated family of power indices for simple n-person games". Public Choice. 35 (2): 229–239. doi:10.1007/BF00140846.
- Holler, Manfred J.; Packel, Edward W. (1983). "Power, luck and the right index". Zeitschrift für Nationalökonomie. 43: 21–29. doi:10.1007/BF01283881. S2CID 153499901.
- Deegan, John; Packel, Edward W. (1983). "To the (Minimal Winning) Victors Go the (Equally Divided) Spoils: A New Power Index for Simple n-Person Games". Political and Related Models. pp. 239–255. doi:10.1007/978-1-4612-5430-0_10. ISBN 978-1-4612-5432-4. 1983
- Ferejohn, J. A.; McKelvey, R. D.; Packel, E. W. (1984). "Limiting distributions for continuous state Markov voting models". Social Choice and Welfare. 1: 45–67. doi:10.1007/BF00297059. S2CID 85554456.
- Packel, Edward W.; Traub, Joseph F. (1987). "Information-based complexity". Nature. 328 (6125): 29–33. Bibcode:1987Natur.328...29P. doi:10.1038/328029a0. S2CID 4308619.
- Packel, Edward W.; Woźniakowski, Henryk (1987). "Recent developments in information-based complexity". Bulletin of the American Mathematical Society. 17: 9–36. doi:10.1090/S0273-0979-1987-15511-X.
- Packel, Edward W. (1988). "Do Linear Problems Have Linear Optimal Algorithms?". SIAM Review. 30 (3): 388–403. doi:10.1137/1030091.
- Packel, Edward W.; Traub, Joseph F.; Woźniakowski, Henryk (1992). "Measures of uncertainty and information in computation". Information Sciences. 65 (3): 253–273. doi:10.1016/0020-0255(92)90123-P.
- Packel, Edward W.; Yuen, David S. (2004). "Projectile Motion with Resistance and the Lambert W Function". The College Mathematics Journal. 35 (5): 337–350. doi:10.1080/07468342.2004.11922095. S2CID 15207005.

=== Books ===
- Packel, Edward W. (1974). Functional analysis: a short course. New York: Intext Educational Publishers. 1980 edition. Huntington, New York: R. E. Krieger Publishing Company. ISBN 0898740193. LCCN 79021888.
- Packel, Edward W. (1981). Mathematics of games and gambling. Washington, D.C.: Mathematical Association of America. ISBN 088385628X. LCCN 80085037.
- 2006 2nd edition. ISBN 9780883856468. LCCN 2006926250.
- Packel, Edward (19 January 2022). 2022 pbk reprint of 2006 edition. American Mathematical Society. ISBN 978-1-4704-6862-0. LCCN 2006926250.
- Solow, Anita E., ed. (1993). Learning by discovery: a lab manual for calculus. MAA Notes Number 27. Washington, D.C.: Mathematical Association of America (MAA). ISBN 0883850834. LCCN 92062279. Writing team: John B. Fink, Bonnie Gold, Robert A. Messer, and Edward W. Packel; xiii+165 pages; illustrated. Book cover & title page at maa.org
- Packel, Ed; Wagon, Stan (1994). Animating calculus : Mathematica notebooks for the laboratory. New York: W.H. Freeman. 1997 edition. New York: TELOS. 1997. ISBN 0387947485. LCCN 96023164.
- Packel, Edward W. (1996). Mathematica for mathematics teachers: notes from an introductory course. Breckenridge, Colorado: Front Range Press. ISBN 0963167847.
