= Beckenbach Book Prize =

Prize for authors of mathematical books

The Beckenbach Book Prize, formerly known as the Mathematical Association of America Book Prize, is awarded to authors of distinguished, innovative books that have been published by the Mathematical Association of America (MAA). The prize, named in honor of Edwin F. Beckenbach, was established in 1983 and first awarded in 1985. The award is $2500 for the honored author and is awarded on an irregular basis. In January 1985 Charles Robert Hadlock was awarded the MAA Book Prize, which later in 1985 became the Beckenbach Book Prize.

== Recipients ==
The recipients of the Beckenbach Book Prize and their books are:

- 1985: Charles Robert Hadlock, Field Theory and Its Classical Problems
- 1986: Edward W. Packel, The Mathematics of Games and Gambling
- 1989: Thomas M. Thompson, From Error-Correcting Codes through Sphere Packings to Simple Groups
- 1994: Steven G. Krantz, Complex Analysis: The Geometric Viewpoint
- 1996: Constance Reid, The Search for E.T. Bell, Also Known as John Taine
- 1998: Sandor Szabo and Sherman K. Stein, Algebra and Tiling: Homomorphisms in the Service of Geometry
- 1999: David M. Bressoud, Proofs and Confirmations: The Story of the Alternating Sign Matrix Conjecture
- 2002: Joseph Kirtland, Identification Numbers and Check Digits Schemes
- 2004: James Tanton, Solve This: Math Activities for Students and Clubs
- 2006: Arthur Benjamin and Jennifer Quinn, Proofs That Really Count: the Art of Combinatorial Proof
- 2007: William P. Berlinghoff and Fernando Q. Gouvêa, Math through the Ages: A Gentle History for Teachers and Others
- 2008: William Dunham, Euler: The Master of Us All
- 2012: Dan Kalman, Uncommon Mathematical Excursions: Polynomia and Related Realms
- 2012: Nathan Carter, Visual Group Theory
- 2014: Judith Grabiner, A Historian Looks Back: The Calculus as Algebra and Selected Writings
- 2015: Seth Braver, Lobachevski Illuminated
- 2017: Tim Chartier, When Life is Linear: From Computer Graphics to Bracketology
- 2018: Roland van der Veen and Jan van de Craats, The Riemann Hypothesis: A Million Dollar Problem
- 2021: Nathan Carter, Introduction to the Mathematics of Computer Graphics
- 2022: Ron Taylor and Patrick X. Rault, A TeXas-Style Introduction to Proof
- 2024: Roger B. Nelsen, Nuggets of Number Theory: A Visual Approach
- 2025: Claudi Alsina and Roger B. Nelsen A Panoply of Polygons

== See also ==
- Euler Book Prize
- List of mathematics awards
