= Euler Book Prize =

Annual mathematics book award

- Description: Outstanding book in mathematics
- Location: United States
- Presented by: Mathematical Association of America (MAA)
- Reward: $2,000
- First award: 2007
- Website: www.maa.org/programs/maa-awards/book-awards/euler-book-prize

The Euler Book Prize is an award named after Swiss mathematician and physicist Leonhard Euler (1707–1783) and given annually at the Joint Mathematics Meetings by the Mathematical Association of America to an outstanding book in mathematics that is likely to improve the public view of the field.

The prize was founded in 2005 with funds provided by mathematician Paul Halmos (1916–2006) and his wife Virginia Halmos. It was first given in 2007; this date was chosen to honor the 300th anniversary of Euler's birth, as part of the MAA "Year of Euler" celebration. The prize includes a $2,000 cash award. Eligible titles are limited to English-language publications released within the previous five years. If a book has multiple authors, the $2,000 prize is shared among them (as was the case with the 2021 winners, Francis Su and Christopher Jackson.

== Winners ==
- 2007: John Derbyshire, Prime Obsession: Bernhard Riemann and the Greatest Unsolved Problem in Mathematics (Joseph Henry Press, 2003). The main subject of this popular-audience book is the Riemann hypothesis, concerning the location of the zeros of the Riemann zeta function, and its application to the distribution of prime numbers. Due to a miscommunication, Derbyshire missed the award ceremony.
- 2008: Benjamin Yandell, The Honors Class: Hilbert's Problems and Their Solvers (AK Peters, 2002). This book intertwines the stories of the solutions to Hilbert's problems with the biographies of its solvers. The award was given posthumously to Yandell, who died in 2004.
- 2009: Siobhan Roberts, King of Infinite Space: Donald Coxeter, the Man Who Saved Geometry (Walker and Company, 2006). This biography of Harold Scott MacDonald Coxeter also describes the history of geometry and Coxeter's contributions to the field.
- 2010: David S. Richeson, Euler's Gem: The Polyhedron Formula and the Birth of Topology (Princeton University Press, 2008). Richeson relates the history of Euler's formula V − E + F = 2 connecting the numbers of vertices, edges, and faces of a convex polyhedron. The story leads from Euler's first observation in 1750 to modern topology and the mathematics of William Thurston and Grigori Perelman.
- 2011: Timothy Gowers, The Princeton Companion to Mathematics (Princeton University Press, 2008). This book provides an overview of modern research mathematics; Gowers edited the contributions of 133 distinguished mathematicians as well as writing many of the entries in it himself.
- 2012: Daina Taimiņa, Crocheting Adventures with Hyperbolic Planes, A. K. Peters 2009. Taimina has a novel approach to geometry that has brought a whole new audience to mathematics. The book is elegant, from both a visual and mathematical point of view, but is perfectly capable of standing on its mathematical feet as a clear, rigorous introduction to hyperboli geometry.
- 2013: Persi Diaconis, Ronald Graham, Magical Mathematics: The Mathematical Ideas that Animate Great Magic Tricks, Princeton University Press 2011. This magical book, based on the authors’ lifelong passion for magic and mathematics, presents a selection of entertaining tricks that are easy to perform and yet have interesting mathematics inside them.
- 2014: Steven Strogatz, The Joy of x: A Guided Tour of Math, from One to Infinity, Houghton Mifflin Harcourt, 2012. This book is directed to the millions of readers who claim they never really understood what the mathematics they studied was all about. In succinct chapters the book revisits grade-school arithmetic, high-school algebra and geometry, and selected topics from undergraduate mathematics.
- 2015: Edward Frenkel, Love and Math: The Heart of Hidden Reality, Basic Books, 2013. This book reveals a side of math we’ve never seen, suffused with all the beauty and elegance of a work of art. In this heartfelt and passionate book, Frenkel shows that mathematics, far from occupying a specialist niche, goes to the heart of all matter, uniting us across cultures, time, and space.
- 2016: Jordan Ellenberg, How Not to Be Wrong: The Power of Mathematical Thinking, Penguin Press, 2014. The theme of Ellenberg's book is that Mathematics is the extension of common sense by other means. It gives a survey of the application of critical mathematical thinking to situations ranging from sex, politics, lotteries, and diplomacy to physics, biology, and, of course, mathematics itself.
- 2017: Ian Stewart, In Pursuit of the Unknown: 17 Equations That Changed the World, Basic Books, New York, 2012. This book is a truly remarkable read that starts with the Pythagorean theorem and logarithms and progresses to the Black-Scholes equations of finance and the use of Fourier analysis to compress images.
- 2018: Matt Parker, Things to Make and Do in the Fourth Dimension, Farrar, Straus and Giroux (2014). Parker’s book takes readers on a fascinating mathematical journey that includes puzzles, paradoxes, and even 4D space monsters! Although the unifying theme in the book is geometry, it also incorporates ideas from a variety of other fields, including number theory, graph theory, and knot theory.
- 2019: Cathy O'Neil, Weapons of Math Destruction, Crown, 2016. This book tackles an important issue, “the dark side of data science,” in a thoughtful way. It argues that math is not just for solving the world’s problems; it is responsible also for fueling some of them.
- 2020: Tim Chartier, Math Bytes: Google Bombs, Chocolate-Covered Pi, and Other Cool Bits in Computing, Princeton University Press, 2014. This book gives readers a taste of the mathematics and computing applications that underlie many aspects of everyday life. It includes a wide array of topics, including fractals, fonts, tweets, basketball, Google, digital images, movies, and more.
- 2021: Francis Su and Christopher Jackson, Mathematics for Human Flourishing, Yale University Press (2020). This book presents mathematics as a discipline that has the power to transform lives and speak to the very core of what it means to be human. Su’s thesis is driven home in dramatic fashion through the included writings of Christopher Jackson, who discovered the transformative power of mathematics from behind prison walls.
- 2022: Allison Henrich, Emille D. Lawrence, Matthew Pons, and David Taylor, eds., Living Proof: Stories of Resilience Along the Mathematical Journey, MAA and AMS (2019). This book powerfully illustrates that while studying mathematics is far from a trivial endeavor, mathematicians “engage the struggle” in myriad different ways. It casts a compelling vision of a mathematical community that is far more diverse, inclusive, and accessible than history and popular perception might suggest.
- 2023: Susan D'Agostino, How to Free Your Inner Mathematician: Notes on Mathematics and Life, United Kingdom: Oxford University Press (2020). With its short easily digestible chapters, this book leads the reader through brief introductions to an enormous variety of mathematical topics. Some of the topics are standard fare for popular mathematics books, but many others are new. Inspiring life lessons are drawn from either the history or the mathematics itself.
- 2024: Sarah B. Hart, Once Upon a Prime: The Wondrous Connections Between Mathematics and Literature. New York: Macmillan, 2023. Drawing from a rich tapestry of literary and mathematical traditions and cultures, Hart skillfully uncovers the significant role mathematics plays in literature.
- 2025: Ismar Volić, Making Democracy Count: How Mathematics Improves Voting, Electoral Maps, and Representation. Princeton University Press, 2024 Volić brings complex topics, such as voting theory, apportionment, gerrymandering, and the Electoral College, to life, showing how mathematics plays a crucial role in collective decision-making.
- 2026: Stéphane Douady, Jacques Dumais, Christophe Golé, and Nancy Pick, Do Plants Know Math?: Unwinding the Story of Plant Spirals, from Leonardo da Vinci to Now. Princeton University Press, 2024. Focusing on phyllotaxis and the Fibonacci series, with forays into logarithmic spirals, soap bubbles, fractals, and Japanese kirigami, the book traces the mathematical patterns found in plant spirals through centuries of scientific inquiry, from Leonardo da Vinci to Alan Turing.

== See also ==
- Beckenbach Book Prize
- List of mathematics awards
