= Francis Su =

American mathematician

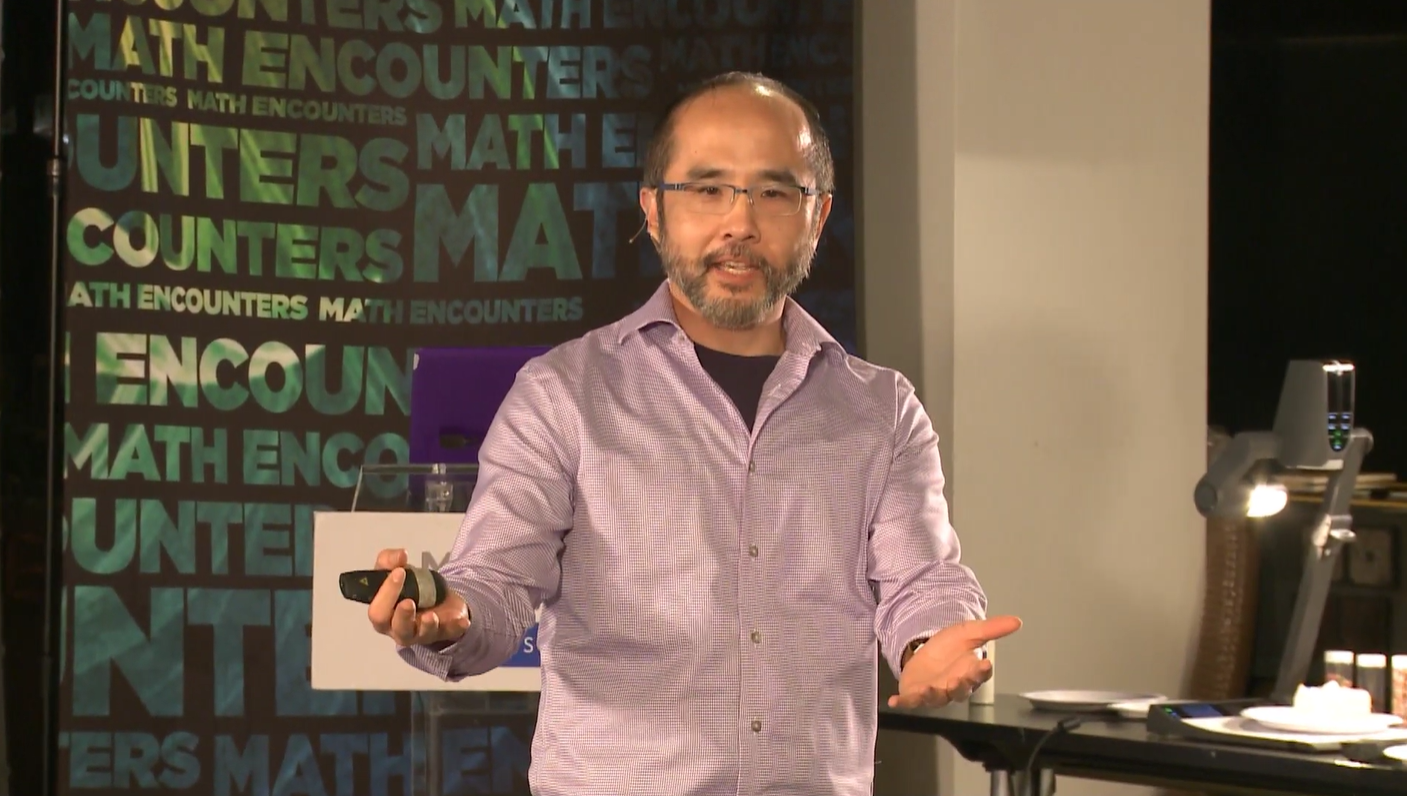
- Francis Su in 2018 at the National Museum of Mathematics
- Education: University of Texas at Austin (BS); Harvard University (PhD)
- Scientific career
- Fields: Mathematics
- Doctoral advisor: Persi Diaconis

President of the Mathematical Association of America
- In office February 1, 2015 – January 31, 2017
- Preceded by: Robert L. Devaney
- Succeeded by: Deanna Haunsperger

Francis Edward Su is an American mathematician. He joined the Harvey Mudd College faculty in 1996, and is currently Benediktsson-Karwa Professor of Mathematics. Su served as president of the Mathematical Association of America from 2015 to 2017 and served as Vice President of the American Mathematical Society from 2020 to 2023. Su has received multiple awards from the MAA, including the Henry L. Alder Award and a Deborah and Franklin Haimo Award for Distinguished College or University Teaching of Mathematics, both for distinguished teaching. He was also a Phi Beta Kappa Visiting Scholar during the 2019–2020 term. He was elected as a Fellow of the American Mathematical Society, in the 2025 class of fellows.

Su received his B.S. in mathematics from the University of Texas, graduating Phi Beta Kappa in 1989. He went on to receive his Ph.D. from Harvard University in 1995, where his advisor was Persi Diaconis. His research area is combinatorics, and he is particularly known for his work on fair division.

Su and Michael Starbird are co-authors of the book Topology Through Inquiry. His book, Mathematics for Human Flourishing, was released on 7 January 2020. The latter book is based on his speech of the same title, delivered Jan 6, 2017 at the Joint Math Meetings. He won the Halmos-Ford Award for Distinguished Writing in 2018 for that speech. Three of his articles have been featured on "The Princeton Anthology of the Best Writing in Mathematics" in the years 2011, 2014, and 2018. In 2021 he received the Euler Book Prize jointly with Christopher Jackson.

== Selected publications ==
- Starbird, Michael; Su, Francis (2019). Topology Through Inquiry. American Mathematical Society. ISBN 978-1-4704-5276-6.
- Su, Francis (2020). Mathematics for Human Flourishing. With Reflections by Christopher Jackson. Yale University Press. ISBN 9780300237139.
