= David Richeson =

American mathematician

David S. Richeson is an American mathematician whose interests include the topology of dynamical systems, recreational mathematics, and the history of mathematics. He is a professor of mathematics at Dickinson College, where he holds the John J. & Ann Curley Faculty Chair in the Liberal Arts.

== Education and career ==
Richeson was interested in mathematics from an early age, in part through Martin Gardner's Mathematical Games columns. He graduated from Hamilton College in 1993, and completed his Ph.D. at Northwestern University in 1998; his dissertation, Connection Matrix Pairs for the Discrete Conley Index, was supervised by John Franks.

Richeson joined the Dickinson College faculty after postdoctoral research at Michigan State University. He was the editor of Math Horizons from 2014 to 2019.

== Books ==
Richeson is the author of the book Euler's Gem: The Polyhedron Formula and the Birth of Topology (Princeton University Press, 2008; paperback, 2012), on the Euler characteristic of polyhedra. The book won the 2010 Euler Book Prize of the Mathematical Association of America.

His second book, Tales of Impossibility: The 2000-Year Quest to Solve the Mathematical Problems of Antiquity (Princeton University Press, 2019), concerns four famous problems of straightedge and compass construction, unsolved by the ancient Greek mathematicians and now known to be impossible: doubling the cube, squaring the circle, constructing regular polygons of any order, and trisecting the angle.
