= Joseph Kirtland =

American mathematician

Joseph Kirtland is a mathematician, specializing in group theory. His 2000 book Identification Numbers and Check Digit Schemes won the 2002 Beckenbach Book Prize.

== Biography ==
Kirkland matriculated in 1981 at Syracuse University, where he graduated in 1985 with a B.S. in mathematics. At the University of New Hampshire, he graduated in mathematics with an M.S. in 1987 and a Ph.D. in 1992. His Ph.D. thesis Finite Groups as a Generalization of Vector Spaces through the Use of Splitting Systems was supervised by Homer Franklin Bechtell Jr. (1929–2022). In September 1992, Kirtland joined the staff of the computer science and mathematics department of Marist College. From the academic year 1994–1995 to the academic year 2006–2007, he received 10 times the Faculty Recognition Award given by Marist College's Student Academic Council. In 2002 the Metropolitan New York Section of the Mathematics Association of America (MAA) gave him their Award for Distinguished College or University Teaching of Mathematics. At Marist College, he has taught a wide variety of mathematics courses. Kirtland, the author of three books, has done research on group theory and has published not only on group theory but also on linear algebra, mathematics education, and mathematical computing.

== Personal life ==
Kirtland and his wife Cindy are the parents of a son and a daughter. He and his wife have hiked all of the mountains over 3,500 feet (1,100 m) in the Catskill Mountains.

== Selected publications ==
=== Articles ===
- Kirtland, Joseph (1994). "The geometry of finite groups through the use of splitting systems". Communications in Algebra. 22 (3): 735–764. doi:10.1080/00927879408824873.
- —— (1994). "Direct products of inseparable finite groups". Archiv der Mathematik. 62 (4): 289–291. doi:10.1007/BF01201778. S2CID 120879635.
- —— (1995). "Finite solvable multiprimitive groups". Communications in Algebra. 23: 335–356. doi:10.1080/00927879508825224.
- —— (1997). "Direct products of inseparable finite groups, II". Communications in Algebra. 25: 243–246. doi:10.1080/00927879708825850.
- Kappe, Luise-Charlotte; —— (2000). "Supplementation in groups". Glasgow Mathematical Journal. 42: 37–50. doi:10.1017/S0017089500010065.
- Kappe, L.-C.; —— (2003). "Finite groups with trivial Frattini subgroup". Archiv der Mathematik. 80 (3): 225–234. doi:10.1007/s00013-003-0788-y. S2CID 116543112.
- ——; Hoh, Pau-San (2004). "Freshmen Can Offer Mathematical Solutions to Real-World Issues". FOCUS. 24 (8): 25–26. November 2004, Focus issue
- —— (2008). "The Puzzle "No. Crunch" and Word Length in the Symmetric Group". The UMAP Journal. 29 (4): 431–448.
- —— (2009). "Find proper factorizations in finite groups". Algebra and Discrete Mathematics. 8 (2): 49–59.
- —— (2011). "Finite groups with all subgroups not contained in the Frattini subgroup permutable". Archiv der Mathematik. 97 (5): 399–406. doi:10.1007/s00013-011-0316-4. S2CID 122169786.
- —— (2015). "On two classes of finite inseparable p-groups". Acta Mathematica Sinica, English Series. 31 (7): 1203–1214. doi:10.1007/s10114-015-3309-6. S2CID 254143504.
- —— (11 September 2017). Complementation of Normal Subgroups: In Finite Groups. Walter de Gruyter GmbH & Co KG. ISBN 978-3-11-048021-4.
- —— (2020). "A note on a class of generalized nilpotent groups introduced by Bechtell and Doerk". Communications in Algebra. 48 (10): 4142–4148. doi:10.1080/00927872.2020.1756310. S2CID 218921293.

=== Books ===
- Kirtland, Joseph (31 December 2000). Identification Numbers and Check Digit Schemes. American Mathematical Soc. ISBN 978-0-88385-720-5.
  - 2001 edition. Cambridge University Press. 29 March 2001. ISBN 978-0-88385-720-5. LCCN 00108052.
- Kirtland, Joseph (11 September 2017). Complementation of Normal Subgroups: In Finite Groups. Walter de Gruyter GmbH & Co KG. ISBN 978-3-11-047892-1. LCCN 2017036955.
- Kirtland, Joseph (21 November 2020). Proofs 101: An Introduction to Formal Mathematics. CRC Press. ISBN 978-1-000-22734-5. abstract at Taylor & Francis website
  - 2021 ebook edition. CRC Press, Taylor & Francis. 21 November 2020. ISBN 9781003082927. LCCN 2020027998.
