= Euler's Gem =

2008 mathematics book

Euler's Gem: The Polyhedron Formula and the Birth of Topology
- Author: David Richeson
- Language: English
- Genre: Mathematics
- Publisher: Princeton University Press
- Publication date: 2008
- Publication place: United States

Euler's Gem: The Polyhedron Formula and the Birth of Topology is a book on the formula $V-E+F=2$ for the Euler characteristic of convex polyhedra and its connections to the history of topology. It was written by David Richeson and published in 2008 by the Princeton University Press, with a paperback edition in 2012. It won the 2010 Euler Book Prize of the Mathematical Association of America.

== Topics ==
The book is organized historically, and reviewer Robert Bradley divides the topics of the book into three parts. The first part discusses the earlier history of polyhedra, including the works of Pythagoras, Thales, Euclid, and Johannes Kepler, and the discovery by René Descartes of a polyhedral version of the Gauss–Bonnet theorem (later seen to be equivalent to Euler's formula). It surveys the life of Euler, his discovery in the early 1750s that the Euler characteristic $V-E+F$ (the number of vertices minus the number of edges plus the number of faces) is equal to 2 for all convex polyhedra, and his flawed attempts at a proof, and concludes with the first rigorous proof of this identity in 1794 by Adrien-Marie Legendre, based on Girard's theorem relating the angular excess of triangles in spherical trigonometry to their area.

Although polyhedra are geometric objects, Euler's Gem argues that Euler discovered his formula by being the first to view them topologically (as abstract incidence patterns of vertices, faces, and edges), rather than through their geometric distances and angles. (However, this argument is undermined by the book's discussion of similar ideas in the earlier works of Kepler and Descartes.) The birth of topology is conventionally marked by an earlier contribution of Euler, his 1736 work on the Seven Bridges of Königsberg, and the middle part of the book connects these two works through the theory of graphs. It proves Euler's formula in a topological rather than geometric form, for planar graphs, and discusses its uses in proving that these graphs have vertices of low degree, a key component in proofs of the four color theorem. It even makes connections to combinatorial game theory through the graph-based games of Sprouts and Brussels Sprouts and their analysis using Euler's formula.

In the third part of the book, Bradley moves on from the topology of the plane and the sphere to arbitrary topological surfaces. For any surface, the Euler characteristics of all subdivisions of the surface are equal, but they depend on the surface rather than always being 2. Here, the book describes the work of Bernhard Riemann, Max Dehn, and Poul Heegaard on the classification of manifolds, in which it was shown that the two-dimensional compact topological surfaces can be completely described by their Euler characteristics and their orientability. Other topics discussed in this part include knot theory and the Euler characteristic of Seifert surfaces, the Poincaré–Hopf theorem, the Brouwer fixed point theorem, Betti numbers, and Grigori Perelman's proof of the Poincaré conjecture.

An appendix includes instructions for creating paper and soap-bubble models of some of the examples from the book.

== Audience and reception ==
Euler's Gem is aimed at a general audience interested in mathematical topics, with biographical sketches and portraits of the mathematicians it discusses, many diagrams and visual reasoning in place of rigorous proofs, and only a few simple equations. With no exercises, it is not a textbook. However, the later parts of the book may be heavy going for amateurs, requiring at least an undergraduate-level understanding of calculus and differential geometry. Reviewer Dustin L. Jones suggests that teachers would find its examples, intuitive explanations, and historical background material useful in the classroom.

Although reviewer Jeremy L. Martin complains that "the book's generalizations about mathematical history and aesthetics are a bit simplistic or even one-sided", points out a significant mathematical error in the book's conflation of polar duality with Poincaré duality, and views the book's attitude towards computer-assisted proof as "unnecessarily dismissive", he nevertheless concludes that the book's mathematical content "outweighs these occasional flaws". Dustin Jones evaluates the book as "a unique blend of history and mathematics ... engaging and enjoyable", and reviewer Bruce Roth calls it "well written and full of interesting ideas". Reviewer Janine Daems writes, "It was a pleasure reading this book, and I recommend it to everyone who is not afraid of mathematical arguments".

== See also ==
- List of books about polyhedra
