= Love and Math =

2013 book by Edward Frenkel

Love and Math is a book about mathematics written by Edward Frenkel which was published in October 2013. It was a New York Times bestseller, and was the 2015 winner of the Euler Book Prize. As of February 2016, it has been published in 16 languages.

== Reception ==
In a review published in The New York Review of Books, Jim Holt called Love and Math a "winsome new memoir" which is "three things: a Platonic love letter to mathematics; an attempt to give the layman some idea of its most magnificent drama-in-progress; and an autobiographical account, by turns inspiring and droll, of how the author himself came to be a leading player in that drama.”

The New York Times review called the book "powerful, passionate and inspiring."

Keith Devlin wrote in The Huffington Post: "With every page, I found my mind's eye conjuring up a fictional image of the book's author, writing by candlelight in the depths of the Siberian winter like Omar Sharif's Doctor Zhivago in the David Lean movie adaptation of Pasternak's famous novel. Love and Math is Edward Frenkel's Lara poems... As is true for all the great Russian novels, you will find in Frenkel's tale that one person's individual story of love and overcoming adversity provides both a penetrating lens on society and a revealing mirror into the human mind."

Peter Woit, author of Not Even Wrong, wrote in a blog post:

The Love of the title is much more about love of mathematics than love of another person, as Frenkel provides a detailed story of what it is like to fall in love with mathematics, then pursue this deeply, ending up doing mathematics at the highest level.
