= David Ben-Zvi =

American mathematician (born 1974)

David Dror Ben-Zvi
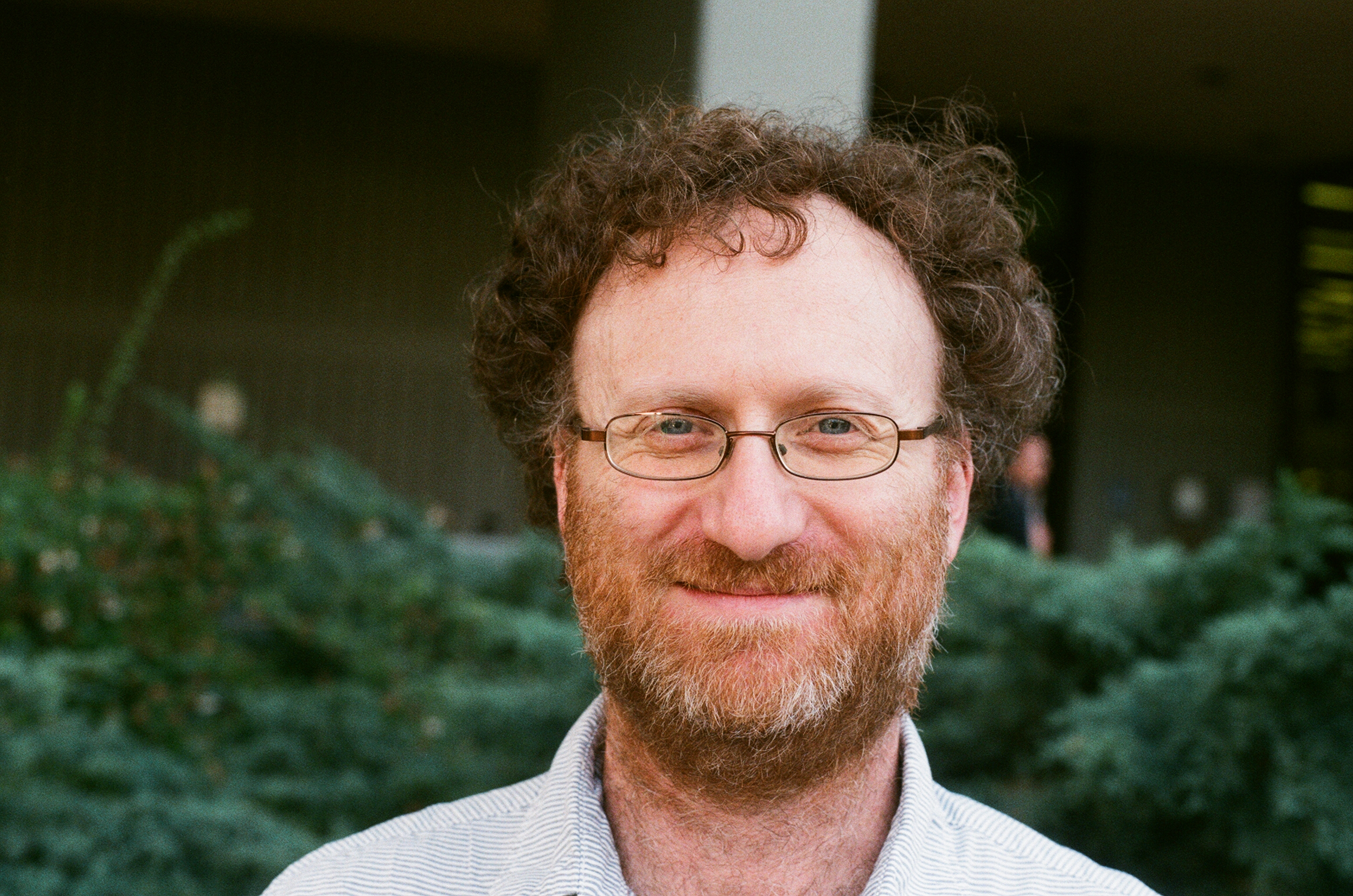
- Born: 1974 (age 51–52); San Francisco, California, U.S.
- Education: Princeton University (BA); Harvard University (PhD)
- Scientific career
- Fields: Algebraic geometry
- Institutions: University of Texas at Austin; Institute for Advanced Study; University of California, Berkeley; University of Chicago; The Geometry Center University of Minnesota
- Thesis: Spectral Curves, Opers And Integrable Systems (1999)
- Doctoral advisor: Edward Frenkel
- Website: https://web.ma.utexas.edu/users/benzvi/

David Dror Ben-Zvi (born 1974) is an American mathematician. He is currently a professor of mathematics at the University of Texas at Austin.

== Early life and education ==
David Ben-Zvi was born in the San Francisco Bay Area, and grew up in Rehovot, Israel, and Setauket, New York. He graduated a valedictorian from Ward Melville High School and was a finalist in the Westinghouse Science Talent Search. He then graduated summa cum laude from Princeton University.

Ben-Zvi earned his Ph.D. from Harvard University in 1999, with a dissertation titled Spectral Curves, Opers And Integrable Systems supervised by Edward Frenkel. In 2012, he became one of the inaugural Fellows of the American Mathematical Society.

== Honors and awards ==
- Fellow of the American Mathematical Society, elected in inaugural class, 2012.
- Plenary Lecture, AMS Central Sectional Meeting, Baylor University, 2009.
- London Mathematical Society Invited Lecture Series, Oxford, 2007.
- Princeton University Department of Mathematics Undergraduate Prizes, 1993 Brown Prize, 1994 Covington Prize, 1994 Miller Prize, Barry M. Goldwater Scholarship, 1993-1994.

== Bibliography ==
=== Books ===
Vertex Algebras and Algebraic Curves (with E. Frenkel). Mathematical Surveys and Monographs 88, American Mathematical Society 2001.

=== Selected articles ===
- David Ben-Zvi, John Francis and David Nadler, Integral transforms and Drinfeld centers in derived algebraic geometry, J. Amer. Math. Soc. 23 (2010), 909-966
- David Ben-Zvi and David Nadler, Loop spaces and connections, Journal of Topology, Volume 5, Issue 2, June 2012, Pages 377–430
