= Benjamin Yandell =

American author

Benjamin Hart Yandell (16 March 1951, Pasadena – 25 August 2004, Pasadena) was an American author, known as the posthumous winner of the 2008 Euler Book Prize.

He graduated in 1973 with a bachelor's degree from Stanford University.

Yandell was a mathematical boy-genius who, after graduating from Stanford Phi Beta Kappa with departmental honors in mathematics, chose to become a poet and worked as a TV repairman in South Central LA.

On 26 August 1974, he married Janet Alaine Nippell (born 1951), who was for some years on the editorial staff of the Los Angeles Times. They wrote a book about walks they took together in various neighborhoods of Los Angeles. Their book Mostly on Foot: A Year in L.A. was published in 1989.

After reading a biography of David Hilbert, Benjamin Yandell began studying the biographies of those mathematicians who did successful research on the 23 problems posed by Hilbert in 1900. After ten years of work, Yandell's completed his book “The Honors Class: Hilbert’s Problems and Their Solvers”, published in 2002.

The distinguished mathematician Hermann Weyl, who was one of Hilbert’s students, had dubbed the Hilbert problem-solvers “the honors class of the mathematical community.”

Yandell's book is part of a huge literature on Hilbert's problems and is somewhat unusual in the emphasis it puts on the lives of mathematicians instead of the mathematics itself.

The book is intended for a broad audience, so there is little serious mathematics. The best mathematical parts consist of well-known and nice illustrations of mathematical ideas and concepts. ... The story is about mathematicians and their connections, rather than about mathematics.

Upon his death he was survived by his wife and their daughter, Kate Louise Yandell (born 1988), who is a science writer dealing with biology.
