= Tim Chartier =

American mathematician (born 1969)

Timothy P. Chartier (born 1969) is an American mathematician known for his expertise in sports analytics and bracketology, for his popular mathematics books, and for the "mime-matics" shows combining mime and mathematics that he and his wife Tanya have staged.

He is Joseph R. Morton Professor of Mathematics and Computer Science at Davidson College. The National Museum of Mathematics announced him as 2022-23 Distinguished Visiting Professor for the Public Dissemination of Mathematics, in June 2021.

== Education and career ==
Chartier majored in applied mathematics at Western Michigan University, graduating in 1993, and stayed at Western Michigan for a master's degree in computational mathematics in 1996. He completed a PhD at the University of Colorado Boulder in 2001, with the dissertation Algebraic Multigrid Based on Element Interpolation (AMGe) and Spectral AMGe supervised by Steve McCormick. He has also studied mime, at the Centre du Silence in Colorado, at the Dell'Arte International School of Physical Theatre in California, and with Marcel Marceau.

After postdoctoral research at the University of Washington, he joined the Davidson College faculty in 2003. As well as his academic work, he is also a frequent consultant on sports analytics for ESPN, NASCAR, the National Basketball Association, and other groups.

== Books ==
Chartier is the author of Math Bytes: Google Bombs, Chocolate-Covered Pi, and Other Cool Bits in Computing (2014), which won the Euler Book Prize in 2020, and of When Life is Linear: From Computer Graphics to Bracketology (2015), which won the Beckenbach Book Prize in 2017.

He is also the author of X Games In Mathematics: Sports Training That Counts! (2020) and the coauthor, with Anne Greenbaum, of Numerical Methods: Design, Analysis, and Computer Implementation of Algorithms (2012).
