= Israel Packel =

American attorney, jurist and politician

Attorney General of Pennsylvania
- In office 1973–1974
- Governor: Milton Shapp
- Preceded by: J. Shane Creamer
- Succeeded by: Robert P. Kane

Associate Justice of the Pennsylvania Supreme Court
- In office June 1, 1977 – December 26, 1977

Personal details
- Born: December 28, 1907 Philadelphia, Pennsylvania, U.S.
- Died: July 1, 1987 (aged 79)
- Party: Democratic
- Children: Edward W. Packel
- Education: University of Pennsylvania

Israel Packel (December 28, 1907 – July 1, 1987) was an American attorney, jurist and politician. He served as attorney general of Pennsylvania from 1973 to 1974.

== Life and career ==
Packel was born in Philadelphia, Pennsylvania. He attended the University of Pennsylvania and served in the United States Navy during World War II.

Packel was a superior court judge.

Packel served as attorney general of Pennsylvania from 1973 to 1974.

In 1977, Packel was appointed to serve as an associate justice of the Pennsylvania Supreme Court.

Packel died on July 1, 1987, at the age of 79.
