= Weapons of Math Destruction =

2016 nonfiction book by Cathy O'Neil

- First edition
- Author: Cathy O'Neil
- Language: English
- Subject: Mathematics, race, ethnicity
- Genre: Non-fiction
- Publisher: Crown Books
- Publication date: 2016
- Publication place: United States
- Awards: Euler Book Prize
- ISBN: 0553418815

Weapons of Math Destruction is a 2016 American book about the societal impact of algorithms, written by Cathy O'Neil. It explores how some big data algorithms are increasingly used in ways that reinforce preexisting inequality. The book was widely reviewed. It was longlisted for the 2016 National Book Award for Nonfiction and won the Euler Book Prize.

== Overview ==
O'Neil, a mathematician, analyses how the use of big data and algorithms in a variety of fields, including insurance, advertising, education, and policing, can lead to decisions that harm the poor, reinforce racism, and amplify inequality. According to National Book Foundation:

Most troubling, they reinforce discrimination: If a poor student can't get a loan because a lending model deems him too risky (by virtue of his zip code), he's then cut off from the kind of education that could pull him out of poverty, and a vicious spiral ensues. Models are propping up the lucky and punishing the downtrodden, creating a "toxic cocktail for democracy."

She posits that these problematic mathematical tools share three key features: they are opaque, unregulated, and difficult to contest. They are also scalable, thereby amplifying any inherent biases to affect increasingly larger populations. WMDs, or Weapons of Math Destruction, are mathematical algorithms that supposedly take human traits and quantify them, resulting in damaging effects and the perpetuation of bias against certain groups of people.

== Reception ==
The book received widespread praise for elucidating the consequences of reliance on big data models for structuring socioeconomic resources. Clay Shirky from The New York Times Book Review said "O'Neil does a masterly job explaining the pervasiveness and risks of the algorithms that regulate our lives," while pointing out that "the section on solutions is weaker than the illustration of the problem". Kirkus Reviews praised the book for being "an unusually lucid and readable" discussion of a technical subject.

In 2019, the book won the Euler Book Prize of the Mathematical Association of America.

== See also ==
- Resisting AI
