= Math Horizons =

- Cover of November 2008 issue
- Editors: Stuart Boersma
- Former editors: Tom Edgar, David Richeson; Steve Abbot and Bruce Torrence; Arthur T. Benjamin and Jennifer Quinn; Deanna Haunsperger and Steve Kennedy; Don Albers
- Frequency: 4 times yearly
- First issue: 1993
- Company: Taylor & Francis for the Mathematical Association of America
- Country: United States
- Based in: Washington, D.C.
- Language: English
- Website: http://www.maa.org/mathhorizons/
- ISSN: 1072-4117

Math Horizons is a magazine aimed at undergraduates interested in mathematics, published by the Mathematical Association of America. It publishes expository articles about "beautiful mathematics" as well as articles about the culture of mathematics covering mathematical people, institutions, humor, games, cartoons, and book reviews.

The MAA gives the Trevor Evans Awards annually to "authors of exceptional articles that are accessible to undergraduates" that are published in Math Horizons.
