= Cathy O'Neil =

American mathematician

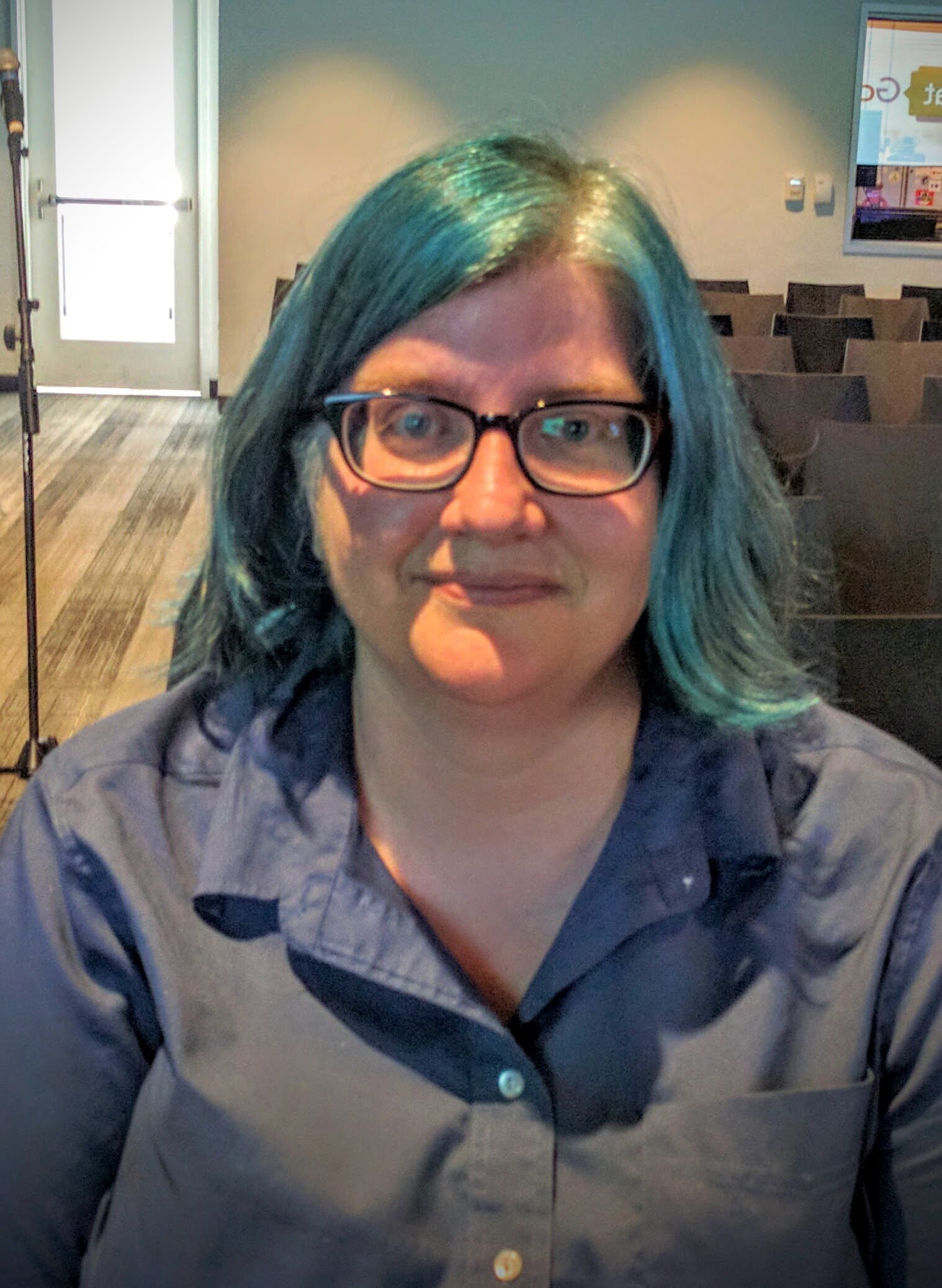
- Cathy O'Neil at Google Cambridge in 2016
- Education: University of California, Berkeley; Harvard University (PhD)
- Scientific career
- Fields: Mathematics
- Workplaces: MIT; Barnard College; D. E. Shaw & Co. Columbia University
- Thesis: Jacobians of Curves of Genus One
- Doctoral advisor: Barry Mazur
- Website: mathbabe.org

Catherine Helen O'Neil (born 1972) is an American mathematician, data scientist, and author. She is the author of the New York Times best-seller Weapons of Math Destruction, and opinion columns in Bloomberg View. O'Neil was active in the Occupy movement.

== Education and career ==
O'Neil attended UC Berkeley as an undergraduate, received a Ph.D. in mathematics from Harvard University in 1999, and afterward held positions in the mathematics departments of MIT and Barnard College. She left academia in 2007, and worked for four years in the finance industry. She worked as an analyst at D. E. Shaw & Co. After becoming disenchanted with the world of finance, O'Neil became involved with the Occupy Wall Street movement, participating in its Alternative Banking Group.

O'Neil operates the blog mathbabe.org and is a contributor to Bloomberg View.

Her first book, Doing Data Science, was written with Rachel Schutt and published in 2013. In 2016, her second book, Weapons of Math Destruction, was published, long-listed for the National Book Award for Nonfiction and became a New York Times best-seller. A third book, The Shame Machine: Who Profits in the New Age of Humiliation, was published in March 2022.

She is the founder of O'Neil Risk Consulting & Algorithmic Auditing (ORCAA), an algorithmic auditing company and is on the board of the nonprofit ORCAA Collaborative Expert Assistance Network (OCEAN).

== Awards ==
In 1993 O'Neil was awarded the Alice T. Schafer Prize from the Association for Women in Mathematics and in 2019 she won the MAA's Euler Book Prize for her book Weapons of Math Destruction.

== Personal life ==
O'Neil lives in Massachusetts and has three sons.

== Bibliography ==
- With Rachel Schutt, Doing Data Science: Straight Talk from the Frontline (O'Reilly 2013, ISBN 1449358659).
- On Being a Data Skeptic (O'Reilly Media 2013, ISBN 1491947233).
- Weapons of Math Destruction (Crown 2016, ISBN 0553418815).
- The Shame Machine: Who Profits in the New Age of Humiliation (Crown 2022, ISBN 1984825453).
