= Alan J. Goldman =

American mathematician

Alan J. Goldman (1932–2010) was an American expert in operations research.

== Career ==
Goldman was born in 1932 and grew up in Brooklyn, where his parents both worked for the public school system. In 1949, he was a winner of the Westinghouse Science Talent Search. He studied mathematics and physics at Brooklyn College, graduating in 1952. He went on to graduate study in mathematics at Princeton University, completing his doctorate in topology in 1957 under the supervision of Ralph Fox. Goldman worked at the National Bureau of Standards from 1956 until 1979, when he became a professor of mathematical sciences at Johns Hopkins University. He retired in 1999.

While at Princeton, Goldman came under the influence of Albert W. Tucker, with whom he published three "seminal papers" in Annals of Mathematics Studies on linear programming and convex polytopes. His work at the National Bureau of Standards included work on facility location for the US Postal Service and on transportation planning; he was also a mentor there to Jack Edmonds and George Nemhauser. After moving to Johns Hopkins, his doctoral students included combinatorialist Arthur T. Benjamin.

In 1976, Goldman won the Gold Medal for Excellence in Service of the US Department of Commerce. He was elected to the National Academy of Engineering in 1989.

== Selected publications ==
- Goldman, A. J.; Tucker, A. W. (1956), "Polyhedral convex cones", Linear equalities and related systems, Annals of Mathematics Studies, vol. 38, Princeton, N.J.: Princeton University Press, pp. 19–40, MR 0087974.
- Goldman, A. J. (1956), "Resolution and separation theorems for polyhedral convex sets", Linear inequalities and related systems, Annals of Mathematics Studies, vol. 38, Princeton, N.J.: Princeton University Press, pp. 41–51, MR 0089113.
- Goldman, A. J.; Tucker, A. W. (1956), "Theory of linear programming", Linear inequalities and related systems, Annals of Mathematics Studies, vol. 38, Princeton, N.J.: Princeton University Press, pp. 53–97, MR 0101826.
- Goldman, A. J. (1971), "Optimal center location in simple networks", Transportation Science, 5 (2): 212–221, doi:10.1287/trsc.5.2.212, MR 0359738.
