= Sarah B. Hart =

British mathematician

- Occupation: Mathematician

Academic background
- Education: Professor
- Alma mater: Balliol College

Academic work
- Discipline: Mathematics
- Institutions: Gresham College

Sarah B. Hart is a British mathematician specialising in group theory. She is a former professor of mathematics at Birkbeck, University of London where she was the head of mathematics and statistics until 2022.

As of 2025, she is the acting provost of Gresham College. She was previously the Gresham Professor of Geometry from 2020 to 2024, the first woman to hold this position "since the chair was established in 1597".

Hart is a keen expositor of mathematics: she has written about the mathematics of Moby-Dick, and her work has been featured on websites like 'Theorem of the Day'.

== Education ==
While still in secondary school, Hart published an exploration (undertaken with her sister) into extending Euler's polyhedral formula to four dimensions.

Hart read mathematics as an undergraduate at Balliol College, Oxford, and has an MSc in Mathematics from the University of Manchester. Her doctorate, from the University of Manchester Institute of Science and Technology (UMIST), addressed Coxeter Groups: Conjugacy Classes and Relative Dominance, under the supervision of Peter Rowley.

== Later career ==
She remained in Manchester on an EPSRC research fellowship and then a temporary teaching position before obtaining a position as lecturer at Birkbeck in 2004. She was promoted to professor in 2013 and became head of the department of economics, mathematics and statistics in 2016.

She was president of the British Society for the History of Mathematics 2020 to 2023.

Rohan Silva, reviewing her 2023 book Once Upon a Prime: The Wondrous Connections Between Mathematics and Literature in The Guardian, said "Hart helps bring to life what she calls 'the enduring conversation between literature and mathematics' – encouraging us to read and roam more widely, whether it is scientists getting stuck into novels, or fiction-lovers throwing themselves at maths conundrums".

== Books ==
Once Upon a Prime: The Wondrous Connections Between Mathematics and Literature (HarperCollins, 2023), winner of the Euler Book Prize.
