= Jennifer Quinn =

American mathematician

Jennifer J. Quinn
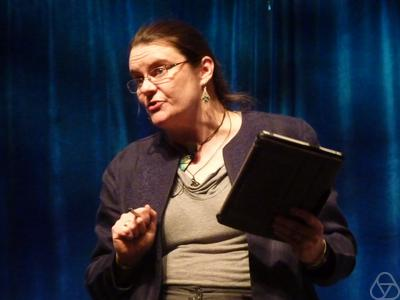
- Jennifer Quinn at 2012 Joint Math Meetings
- Education: Williams College (BA); University of Illinois Chicago (MA); University of Wisconsin-Madison (PhD)
- Known for: Combinatorics
- Awards: MAA Haimo Award; MAA Beckenback Book Award; MAA president (2021–2022)
- Scientific career
- Fields: Mathematics
- Workplaces: University of Washington Tacoma
- Doctoral advisor: Richard Anthony Brualdi

Jennifer J. Quinn is an American mathematician specializing in combinatorics who is a professor of mathematics at the University of Washington Tacoma. She sits on the board of governors of the Mathematical Association of America, and served as its president for the years 2021 and 2022. From 2004 to 2008, she was co-editor of Math Horizons.

== Education and career ==
Quinn went to Williams College as an undergraduate, graduating in 1985. She earned a master's degree from the University of Illinois at Chicago in 1987, and completed her doctorate at the University of Wisconsin–Madison in 1993. Her dissertation, Colorings and Cycle Packings in Graphs and Digraphs, was supervised by Richard A. Brualdi.

She taught at Occidental College until 2005, when she gave up her position as full professor and department chair to move with her husband, biologist Mark Martin, to Washington. She became a part-time lecturer, and executive director of the Association for Women in Mathematics, until earning a faculty position at Tacoma in 2007.

== Recognition ==
Quinn won a Distinguished Teaching Award from the Mathematical Association of America in 2001, and the Deborah and Franklin Tepper Haimo Award for Distinguished College or University Teaching of Mathematics of the association in 2007.

Quinn's book with Arthur T. Benjamin, Proofs that Really Count: The Art of Combinatorial Proof (2003) won the CHOICE Award for Outstanding Academic Title of the American Library Association and the Beckenbach Book Prize of the Mathematical Association of America.

In 2018, Quinn was elected an officer-at-large member of the board of directors of the Mathematical Association of America (MAA). In 2020, Quinn joined the board of directors of the MAA as president-elect. Her term as president began in 2021. In 2022 she will become a fellow of the Association for Women in Mathematics, "For her outstanding achievements as a teacher, mentor, leader, expositor, and editor; for her pioneering service as AWM executive director; and for continued service as AWM volunteer and supporter."
