= National Museum of Mathematics =

Museum in Manhattan, New York

National Museum of Mathematics (MoMath)

- MoMath on Sixth Avenue (2026)
- Established: November 17, 2009 (chartered)
- Location: 635 Sixth Avenue; Manhattan, New York City
- Coordinates: 40°44′26″N 73°59′41″W
- Director: Cindy Lawrence
- President: Manjul Bargava
- Public transit access: New York City Subway: to 14th Street or 23rd Street to Sixth Avenue to 18th Street Port Authority Trans-Hudson: HOB-33, JSQ-33 (via HOB), or JSQ-33 to 23rd Street MTA New York City Bus: M1, M2, M3, M55, M7, M20
- Website: momath.org

The National Museum of Mathematics or MoMath is a mathematics museum in Manhattan, New York City. It opened at its first location on December 12, 2012, with over thirty interactive exhibits. In February 2026, it moved to 635 Sixth Avenue, and now has over sixty interactive exhibits. The mission of the museum is to "enhance public understanding and perception of mathematics". The museum is known for a special tricycle with square wheels, which operates smoothly on a catenary surface.

== History ==
In 2006 the Goudreau Museum on Long Island, at the time the only museum in the United States dedicated to mathematics, closed. In response, a group led by founder and former CEO Glen Whitney met to explore the opening of a new museum. They received a charter from the New York State Education Department in 2009, and raised over 22 million dollars in under four years.

With this funding, a 19,000 square feet (1,800 m^{2}) space was leased in the Goddard Building at 11–13 East 26th Street, located in the Madison Square North Historic District. Despite some opposition to the architectural plans within the local community, permission for construction was granted by the New York City Landmarks Preservation Commission and the Department of Buildings.

George W. Hart was a co-founder of MoMath, which was now North America's only Museum of Mathematics. As chief of content, he spent five years designing its exhibits and workshop activities.

The current board chair is John Overdeck, co-chairman of Two Sigma Investments.

During the COVID-19 pandemic in New York City, the museum closed its physical location on 26th Street. In March 2024, the museum moved to a temporary location at 225 Fifth Avenue. That November, the National Museum of Mathematics announced that it had leased 34,365 square feet (3,192.6 m^{2}) at 635 Avenue of the Americas in Chelsea, Manhattan.

The new site, seven blocks south and one and a half blocks west of the original location, opened in February 2026. With the additional square footage, the museum will eventually have 72 exhibits, including 31 brand-new ones. The upper level features a gallery that hosts rotating exhibits and artwork inspired by mathematical themes.

In February, 2026 Momath named Fields Medalist Manjul Bhargava as its First President.

== Programs ==
- Math Midway is a traveling exhibition of math-based interactive displays. The exhibits include a square-wheeled tricycle that travels smoothly over an undulating cycloidal track; the Ring of Fire, which uses lasers to intersect three-dimensional objects with a two-dimensional plane to uncover interesting shapes; and an "organ function grinder" which allows users to create their own mathematical functions and see the results. After making its debut at the World Science Festival in 2009, Math Midway traveled the country, reaching more than a half million visitors. The Midway's schedule included stops in New York, Pennsylvania, Texas, California, New Jersey, Ohio, Maryland, Florida, Indiana, and Oregon. In 2016, the Math Midway exhibit was sold to the Science Centre Singapore.
- Math Midway 2 Go (MM2GO) is a spinoff of Math Midway. MM2GO includes six of the most popular Math Midway Exhibits. MM2GO began traveling to science festivals, schools, community centers, and libraries in the autumn of 2012.
- Math Encounters is a monthly speaker series presented by the Museum of Math and the Simons Foundation. The lectures initially took place at Baruch College in Manhattan on the first Wednesday of each month, but moved to MoMath's visitor center at 11 East 26th Street in March 2013. Every month a different mathematician is invited to deliver a lecture. Lecturers have included Google's Director of Research Peter Norvig, journalist Paul Hoffman, and computer scientist Craig Kaplan. Examples of topics are "The Geometry of Origami", "The Patterns of Juggling", and "Mathematical Morsels from The Simpsons and Futurama". The lectures are meant to be accessible and engaging for high school students and adults. The first lecture occurred on March 3, 2011. Twenty unique lectures had been delivered as of December 2012.

== Exhibits ==
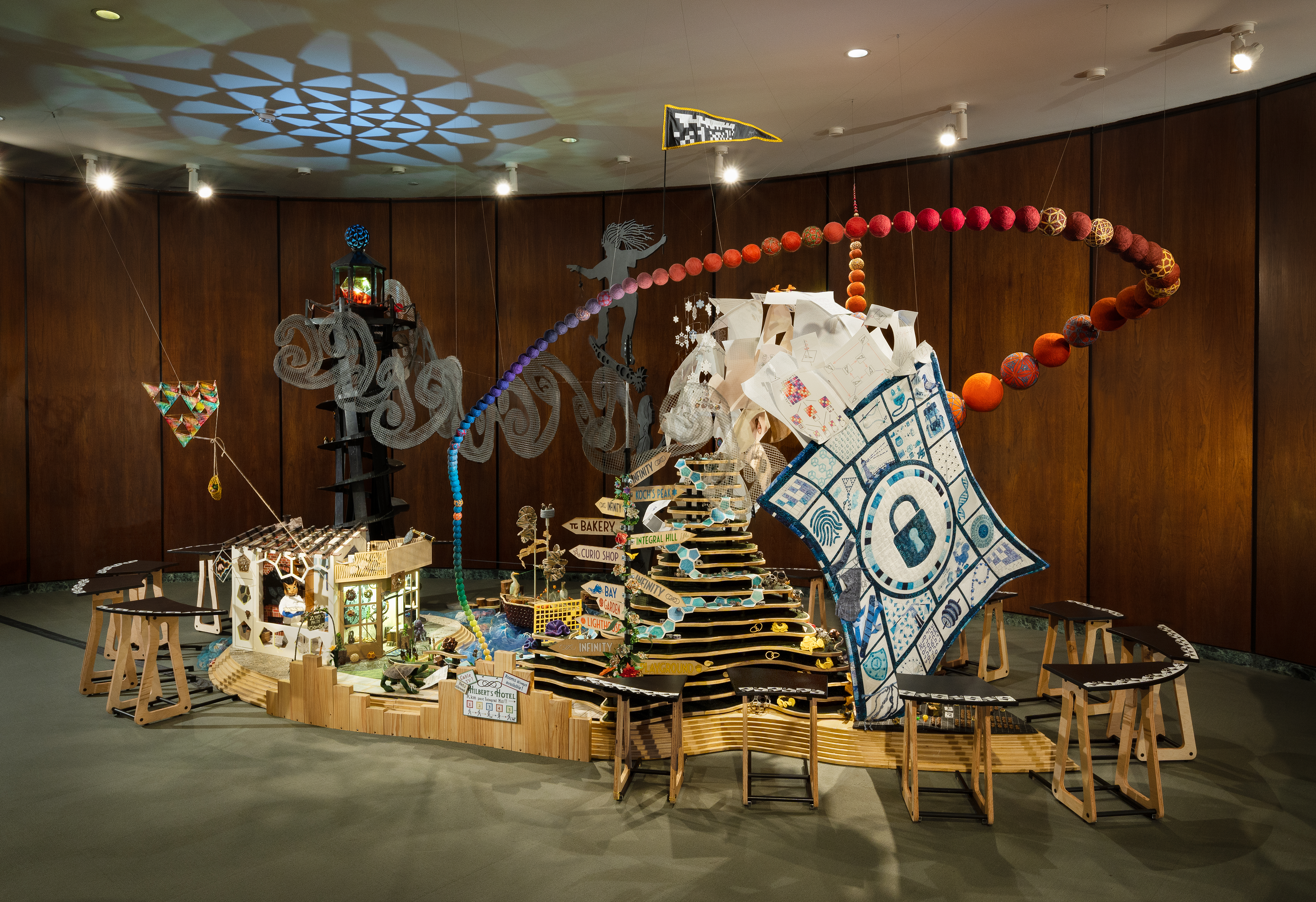
View of a Mathemalchemy installation in 2022

In October 2016, the exhibit The Insides of Things: The Art of Miguel Berrocal was opened, displaying a collection of puzzle sculptures by Spanish artist Miguel Ortiz Berrocal (1933–2006), donated by the late Samuel Sensiper. Each sculpture can be disassembled into small interlocking pieces, eventually revealing a small piece of jewelry or other surprise. The exhibit closed in May 2017.

From May 22 to October 27, 2024, MoMath hosted Mathemalchemy, a special traveling art installation dedicated to a celebration of the intersection of art and mathematics. The exhibit occupied a footprint approximately 20 by 10.5 feet (6.1 by 3.2 m), which extended up to 9.5 feet (2.9 m) in height (in addition, small custom-fabricated tables were arranged around the periphery to protect the more fragile elements). The over 1,000 components of the display incorporated many allusions and models illustrating abstract mathematical concepts, plus humorous mathematical puns and Easter eggs.

== Visiting professorships ==
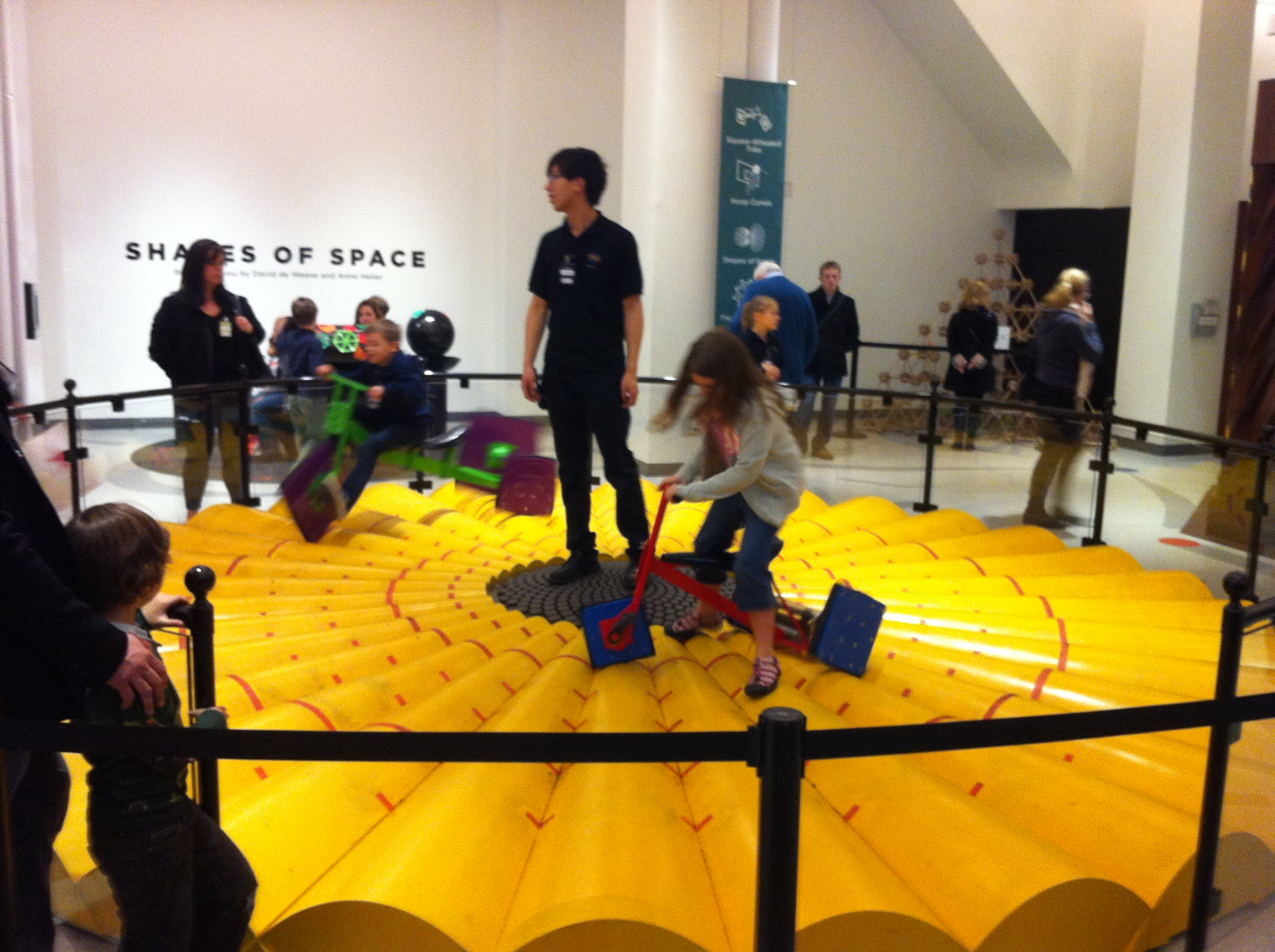
Square wheeled tricycles at MoMath

On August 2, 2018, MoMath announced the creation of a Distinguished Chair for the Public Dissemination of Mathematics. Princeton professor and Fields Medal winner Manjul Bhargava was named as the first recipient of this position.

Dr. Bhargava was succeeded by Peter Winkler, Dartmouth College Professor of Mathematics and Computer Science as the Distinguished Chair for 2019–20.

In July 2020, Rutgers University professor Alex Kontorovich was announced as the Distinguished Chair for 2020–21. Dr. Kontorovich presented public programs concerning the history of mathematical ideas and the intersection of mathematics and music.

The 2021–22 Distinguished Chair for the Public Dissemination of Mathematics was Steven Strogatz, Cornell University Professor of Applied Mathematics, an award-winning mathematician, author and broadcaster.

The fifth Distinguished Chair, announced in June 2021 is Tim Chartier, a Professor of Mathematics and Computer Science at Davidson College and a professionally-trained mime. At the same time, MoMath announced that the 2023–24 Distinguished Chair will be Ingrid Daubechies, Professor of Mathematics at Duke University.

== See also ==
- Mathematica: A World of Numbers... and Beyond – a classic exhibit of mathematical concepts, organized by Ray and Charles Eames
- Mathematics education in the United States and in New York
- Science tourism
