= Edward Frenkel =

Russian-American mathematician

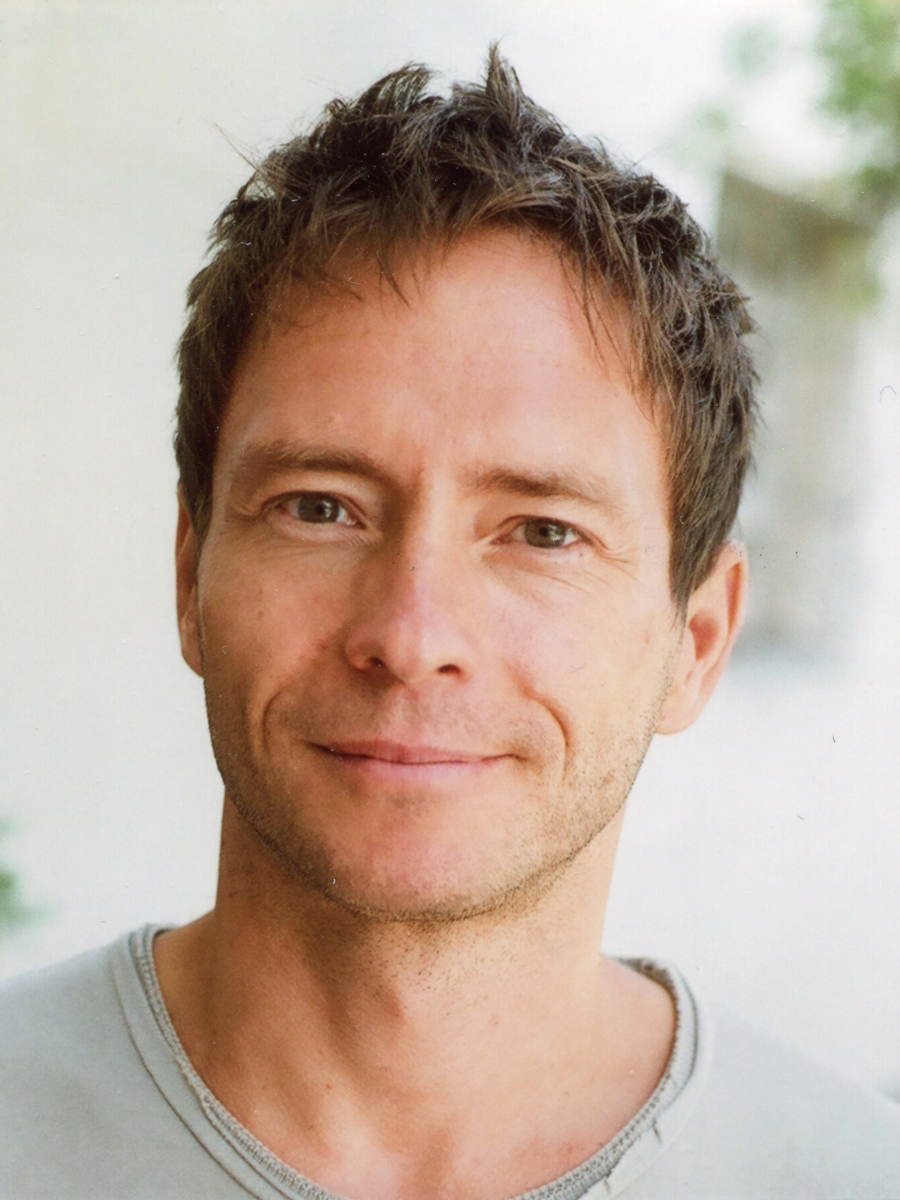
- Frenkel in Berkeley, 2008
- Born: May 2, 1968 (age 58); Kolomna, Soviet Union
- Education: Gubkin University of Oil and Gas; Harvard University
- Known for: Contributions to the Langlands program
- Awards: Hermann Weyl Prize (2002); Euler Book Prize (2015)
- Scientific career
- Fields: Algebraic geometry
- Workplaces: Harvard University; University of California, Berkeley
- Doctoral advisor: Boris Feigin; Joseph Bernstein
- Doctoral students: David Ben-Zvi; Xinwen Zhu

Edward Vladimirovich Frenkel (Russian: Эдуáрд Влади́мирович Фре́нкель; born May 2, 1968) is a Russian-American mathematician working in representation theory, algebraic geometry, and mathematical physics. He is a professor of mathematics at the University of California, Berkeley.

== Early life and education ==
Edward Frenkel was born on May 2, 1968, in Kolomna, Russia, which was then part of the Soviet Union. His father is of Jewish descent and his mother is Russian. As a high school student he studied higher mathematics privately with Evgeny Evgenievich Petrov, although his initial interest was in quantum physics rather than mathematics. He was not admitted to Moscow State University due to antisemitism in Soviet Russia and instead enrolled in the applied mathematics program at the Gubkin University of Oil and Gas. While a student there, he attended the seminar of Israel Gelfand and worked with Boris Feigin and Dmitry Fuchs.

In 1989, upon receiving his undergraduate degree, he was invited to Harvard University and spent a year there as a visiting scholar. In 1990, he enrolled as a graduate student at Harvard. He received his Ph.D. from Harvard University in 1991 after one year of study under the direction of Boris Feigin and Joseph Bernstein.

== Career ==
Frenkel was a Junior Fellow at the Harvard Society of Fellows from 1991 to 1994 and served as an associate professor at Harvard from 1994 to 1997. He has been a professor of mathematics at University of California, Berkeley, since 1997.

== Mathematical work ==
Jointly with Boris Feigin, Frenkel constructed the free field realizations of affine Kac–Moody algebras (these are also known as Wakimoto modules), defined the quantum Drinfeld-Sokolov reduction, and described the center of the universal enveloping algebra of an affine Kac–Moody algebra, sometimes called the Feigin–Frenkel center. The last result, often referred to as Feigin–Frenkel isomorphism, has been used by Alexander Beilinson and Vladimir Drinfeld in their work on the geometric Langlands correspondence. Together with Nicolai Reshetikhin, Frenkel introduced deformations of W-algebras and q-characters of representations of quantum affine algebras.

Frenkel's recent work has focused on the Langlands program and its connections to representation theory, integrable systems, geometry, and physics. Together with Dennis Gaitsgory and Kari Vilonen, he has proved the geometric Langlands conjecture for GL(n). His joint work with Robert Langlands and Ngô Bảo Châu suggested a new approach to the functoriality of automorphic representations and trace formulas. He has also been investigating (in particular, in a joint work with Edward Witten) connections between the geometric Langlands correspondence and dualities in quantum field theory.

Together with Pavel Etingof and David Kazhdan, Frenkel introduced the analytic Langlands correspondence in 2019, a novel function-theoretic framework for the Langlands Program in the case of Riemann surfaces based on the Robert Langlands' question of whether a function-theoretic version of geometric Langlands could be constructed.

== Awards ==
Frenkel was the first recipient of the Hermann Weyl Prize in 2002. Among his other awards are Packard Fellowship for Science and Engineering (1995) and Chaire d'Excellence from Fondation Sciences Mathématiques de Paris.

In 2013, he became a fellow of the American Mathematical Society, for "contributions to representation theory, conformal field theory, affine Lie algebras, and quantum field theory".

In 2014, Frenkel was elected to the American Academy of Arts and Sciences.

== Filmmaking ==
Frenkel has co-produced, co-directed (with Reine Graves) and starred in a short film Rites of Love and Math, a homage to the film Rite of Love and Death (also known as Yûkoku) by the Japanese writer Yukio Mishima. The film premiered in Paris in April, 2010 and was in the official competition of the Sitges International Film Festival in October, 2010. The screening of Rites of Love and Math in Berkeley on December 1, 2010, caused some controversy.

He has also written (with Thomas Farber) a screenplay The Two-Body Problem.

He has appeared on the Numberphile YouTube series, created by Brady Haran.

== Love and Math ==
Frenkel's book Love and Math: The Heart of Hidden Reality was published in October 2013. It was a New York Times bestseller, and was the 2015 winner of the Euler Book Prize. As of July 2024, it has been published in 19 languages.

In a review published in The New York Review of Books, Jim Holt called Love and Math a "winsome new memoir" which is "three things: a Platonic love letter to mathematics; an attempt to give the layman some idea of its most magnificent drama-in-progress; and an autobiographical account, by turns inspiring and droll, of how the author himself came to be a leading player in that drama.”

The New York Times review called the book "powerful, passionate and inspiring."

Keith Devlin wrote in The Huffington Post: "With every page, I found my mind's eye conjuring up a fictional image of the book's author, writing by candlelight in the depths of the Siberian winter like Omar Sharif's Doctor Zhivago in the David Lean movie adaptation of Pasternak's famous novel. Love and Math is Edward Frenkel's Lara poems... As is true for all the great Russian novels, you will find in Frenkel's tale that one person's individual story of love and overcoming adversity provides both a penetrating lens on society and a revealing mirror into the human mind."

Peter Woit, author of Not Even Wrong, wrote in a blog post:

The Love of the title is much more about love of mathematics than love of another person, as Frenkel provides a detailed story of what it is like to fall in love with mathematics, then pursue this deeply, ending up doing mathematics at the highest level.

== Select publications ==
- E. Frenkel, D. Gaitsgory and K. Vilonen: On the geometric Langlands conjecture, 2000.
- E. Frenkel: Frenkel, Edward (2004). "Recent Advances in the Langlands Program" (PDF). Bulletin of the American Mathematical Society. 41 (2): 151–184. doi:10.1090/S0273-0979-04-01001-8. MR 2043750.
- E. Frenkel and D. Ben-Zvi: Vertex Algebras and Algebraic Curves, Mathematical Surveys and Monographs 88, Second Edition, American Mathematical Society 2004, ISBN 0-8218-3674-9.
- E. Frenkel: Lectures on the Langlands Program and Conformal Field Theory. Les Houches. 2005. arXiv:hep-th/0512172.
- E. Frenkel: Langlands Correspondence for Loop Groups. Cambridge Studies in Advanced Mathematics 103. Cambridge University Press. 2007. ISBN 978-0-521-85443-6.
- E. Frenkel and E. Witten: Geometric Endoscopy and Mirror Symmetry, 2007.
- E. Frenkel: Gauge Theory and Langlands Duality. Séminaire Bourbaki. 2009. arXiv:0906.2747.
- E. Frenkel, R. Langlands and B. C. Ngô: Formule des Traces et Fonctorialité: le Début d'un Programme, 2010.
- E. Frenkel and B. C. Ngô: Geometrization of Trace Formulas, 2010.
- P. Etingof, E. Frenkel and D. Kazhdan: A general framework for the analytic Langlands correspondence, 2023.
- Frenkel, Edward (October 2012). "The Fifth problem: math & anti-Semitism in the Soviet Union". newcriterion.com.
- Love and Math: The Heart of Hidden Reality. Basic Books. 2013. ISBN 978-0-465-06995-8.
