= Siobhan Roberts =

Canadian science journalist, biographer and historian of mathematics

- Born: Belleville, Ontario, Canada
- Education: Ryerson University; Queen's University at Kingston
- Occupation: Journalist

Siobhan Roberts is a Canadian science journalist, biographer, and historian of mathematics.

== Education ==
Roberts was born in Belleville, Ontario. She earned a degree in history at Queen's University, then a graduate degree in journalism from Ryerson University in 1997.

== Books ==
Roberts is the author of:

- King of Infinite Space: Donald Coxeter, the Man Who Saved Geometry, about Harold Scott MacDonald Coxeter (Walker & Company, 2006), winner of the Euler Book Prize of the Mathematical Association of America
- Wind Wizard: Alan G. Davenport and the Art of Wind Engineering, about Alan Garnett Davenport (Princeton University Press, 2012), winner of the W. Gordon Plewes History Award of the Canadian Society for Civil Engineering
- Genius At Play: The Curious Mind of John Horton Conway, about John Horton Conway (Bloomsbury, 2015)

== Recognition ==
Roberts has won a number of Canadian National Magazine Awards, and she is the winner of the Communications Award of the Joint Policy Board for Mathematics "for her engaging biographies of eminent mathematicians and articles about mathematics". She won the 2009 Euler Book Prize for her book King of Infinite Space: Donald Coxeter, The Man Who Saved Geometry.
