= Square wheel =

An animation of a square wheel rolling smoothly over inverted catenaries.

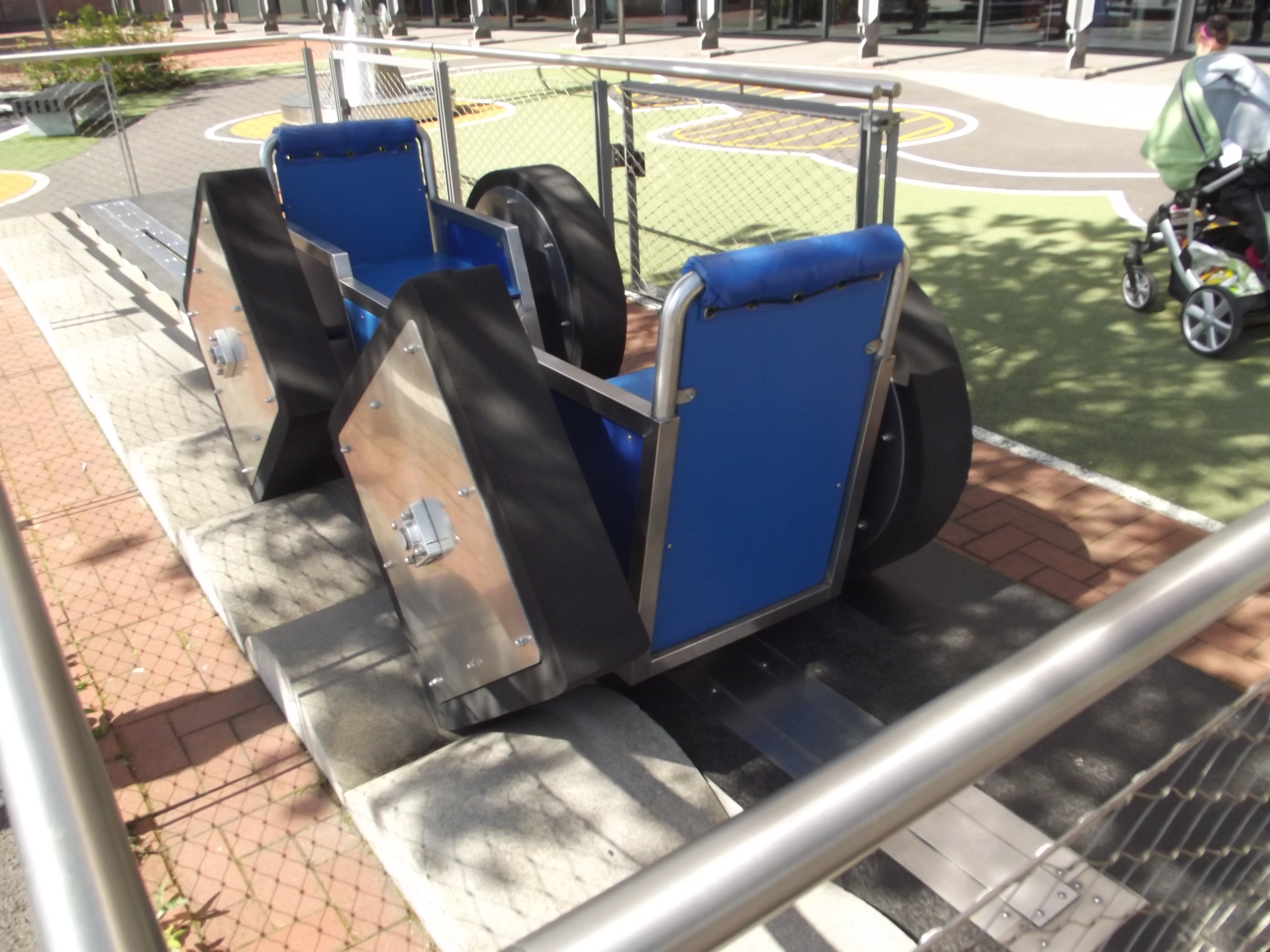
A prototype square wheeled car with modified track at Thinktank Science Garden.

A square wheel can roll smoothly if the ground consists of evenly shaped inverted catenaries of the right size and curvature.

A different type of square-wheeled vehicle was invented in 2006 by Jason Winckler of Global Composites, Inc. in the United States. This has square wheels, linked together and offset by 22.5°, rolling on a flat surface. The prototype appears ungainly, but the inventor proposes that the system may be useful in microscopic-sized machines (MEMS). In 1997 Macalester College mathematics professor Stan Wagon constructed the first prototype of a catenary tricycle. An improved model made out of modern materials was built when the original vehicle wore out in April, 2004.

In 2012, MythBusters experimented with modifying vehicles with square tires, determining that, with speed, a truck fitted with square wheels can deliver a relatively smooth ride.

== See also ==
- Reuleaux triangle
- Non-circular gear
