= Ismar Volić =

Bosnian-American mathematician

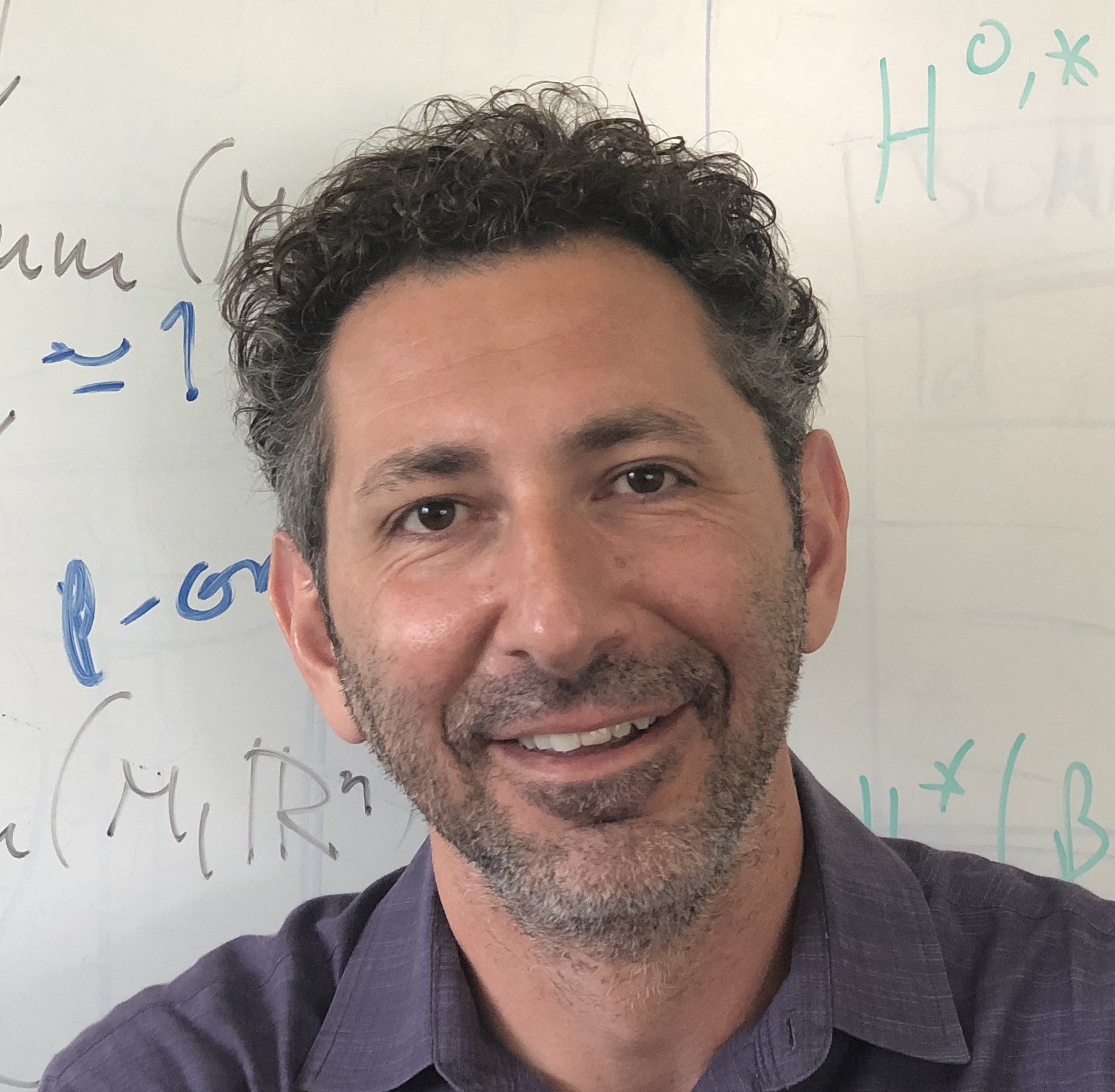
- Education: B.A., Boston University 1998; Ph.D., Brown University 2003
- Occupation: Professor of Mathematics at Wellesley College
- Awards: Fulbright Scholar Fellow of the American Mathematical Society National Science Foundation Simons Foundation
- Website: https://ivolic.wellesley.edu

Ismar Volić is a Bosnian-American mathematician. He is a professor of mathematics at Wellesley College and a co-founder of the Institute for Mathematics and Democracy.

== Education and career ==
Volić completed his undergraduate degree at Boston University in 1998 and his Ph.D. in mathematics at Brown University in 2003 under the direction of Thomas Goodwillie. He was a Whyburn Research Instructor at the University of Virginia from 2003 to 2006. He has been teaching at Wellesley College since 2006. He was the department chair from 2022 to 2025. He was a visiting professor at Louvain-la-Neuve University, the University of Virginia, Harvard University, and MIT.

In 2019, he co-founded the Institute for Mathematics and Democracy to "promote a deeper understanding of mathematics as a pivotal force in creating a democracy where people make informed political decisions and enact change based on objective and rigorous quantitative criteria".

Volić is an active member of the Bosnian-Herzegovinian American Academy of Arts and Sciences, an organization dedicated to advancement of arts and science in Bosnia and Herzegovina. He was its treasurer in 2016–2019, vice-president in 2019–20, and its president in 2021–22. He travels to Bosnia and Herzegovina frequently through his involvement in various education and research activities, including advising Ph.D. students and working with various agencies to bring quality STEM education to the country.

== Research ==
Volić's research is in algebraic topology. He is the author of over thirty articles and two books and has delivered more than two hundred lectures in some twenty countries. He has contributed to the fields of calculus of functors, spaces of embeddings and immersions, configuration space integrals, finite type invariants, Milnor invariants, rational homotopy theory, topological data analysis, and social choice theory.

Volić's book, Making Democracy Count: How Mathematics Improves Voting, Electoral Maps, and Representation, published by Princeton University Press in 2024, won the Mathematical Association of America's Euler Prize and was a finalist for the PROSE Award.

== Selected papers ==
- "Political structures and the topology of simplicial complexes", with A. Mock, Mathematical Social Sciences, 114 (2021), 39–57
- "Formality of the little N-discs operad", with P. Lambrechts, Memoirs of the American Mathematical Society, 239 (2014), no. 1079, 116 pp.
- "The rational homology of spaces of long knots in codimension >2", with P. Lambrechts and V. Turchin, Geometry & Topology, 14 (2010), 2151–2187.
- "Calculus of functors, operad formality, and rational homology of embedding spaces", with G. Arone and P. Lambrechts, Acta Mathematica, 199 (2007), no. 2, 153–198.
- "Finite type knot invariants and calculus of functors", Compositio Mathematica, 142 (2006), 222–250.

== Books ==
- Making Democracy Count: How Mathematics Improves Voting, Electoral Maps, and Representation, Princeton University Press, 2024. 408 pp.
- Cubical homotopy theory, with B. Munson, New Mathematical Monographs, 25. Cambridge University Press, Cambridge, 2015. 625 pp.

== Awards ==
Volić was awarded a 2017-2018 Fulbright U.S. Scholar grant, which he used to visit University of Sarajevo. He was also selected as a Fulbright Specialist for three years in 2020. He has received several grants form the National Science Foundation as well as grants from the Simons Foundation and the Open Society Foundation. His work with the Institute for Mathematics and Democracy was funded by Schwab Charitable and the Hewlett Foundation.

He was elected to the 2026 class of Fellows of the American Mathematical Society.
