= The Mathematics of Games and Gambling =

1981 book by Edward Packel

- Author: Edward Packel
- Language: English
- Series: New Mathematical Library
- Release number: 28
- Subject: Probability theory; Games of chance
- Genre: Mathematics
- Publisher: Mathematical Association of America
- Publication date: 1981

The Mathematics of Games and Gambling is a book on probability theory and its application to games of chance. It was written by Edward Packel, and published in 1981 by the Mathematical Association of America as volume 28 of their New Mathematical Library series, with a second edition in 2006.

== Topics ==
The book has seven chapters. Its first gives a survey of the history of gambling games in western culture, including brief biographies of two famous gamblers, Gerolamo Cardano and Fyodor Dostoevsky, and a review of the games of chance found in Dostoevsky's novel The Gambler. The next four chapters introduce the basic concepts of probability theory, including expectation, binomial distributions and compound distributions, and conditional probability, through games including roulette, keno, craps, chuck-a-luck, backgammon, and blackjack.

The sixth chapter of the book moves from probability theory to game theory, including material on tic-tac-toe, matrix representations of zero-sum games, nonzero-sum games such as the prisoner's dilemma, the concept of a Nash equilibrium, game trees, and the minimax method used by computers to play two-player strategy games. A final chapter, "Odds and ends", includes analyses of bluffing in poker, horse racing, and lotteries.

The second edition adds material on online gambling systems, casino poker machines, and Texas hold 'em poker. It also adds links to online versions of the games, and expands the material on game theory.

== Audience and reception ==
The book is aimed at students, written for a general audience, and does not require any background in mathematics beyond high school algebra. However, many of its chapters include exercises, making it suitable for teaching high school or undergraduate-level courses using it. It is also suitable for readers interested in recreational mathematics. Although it could also be used to improve readers' ability at games of chance, it is not intended for that, as its overall message is that gambling games are best avoided.

Reviewer Sarah Boslaugh notes as a strength of a book the smooth interplay between its mathematical content and the context of the games it describes. Despite noting that the book's description of modern games is based on American practice, and doesn't address the way those games differ in Britain, reviewer Stephen Ainley calls the book "very enjoyable", adding that "it is hard to see how it could be done better or more readably". Reviewer J. Wade Davis calls it "accessible and very entertaining".

== Recognition ==
The Basic Library List Committee of the Mathematical Association of America has listed this book as essential for inclusion in undergraduate mathematics libraries. It was the 1986 winner of the Beckenbach Book Prize.
