= Arthur T. Benjamin =

American mathematician (born 1961)

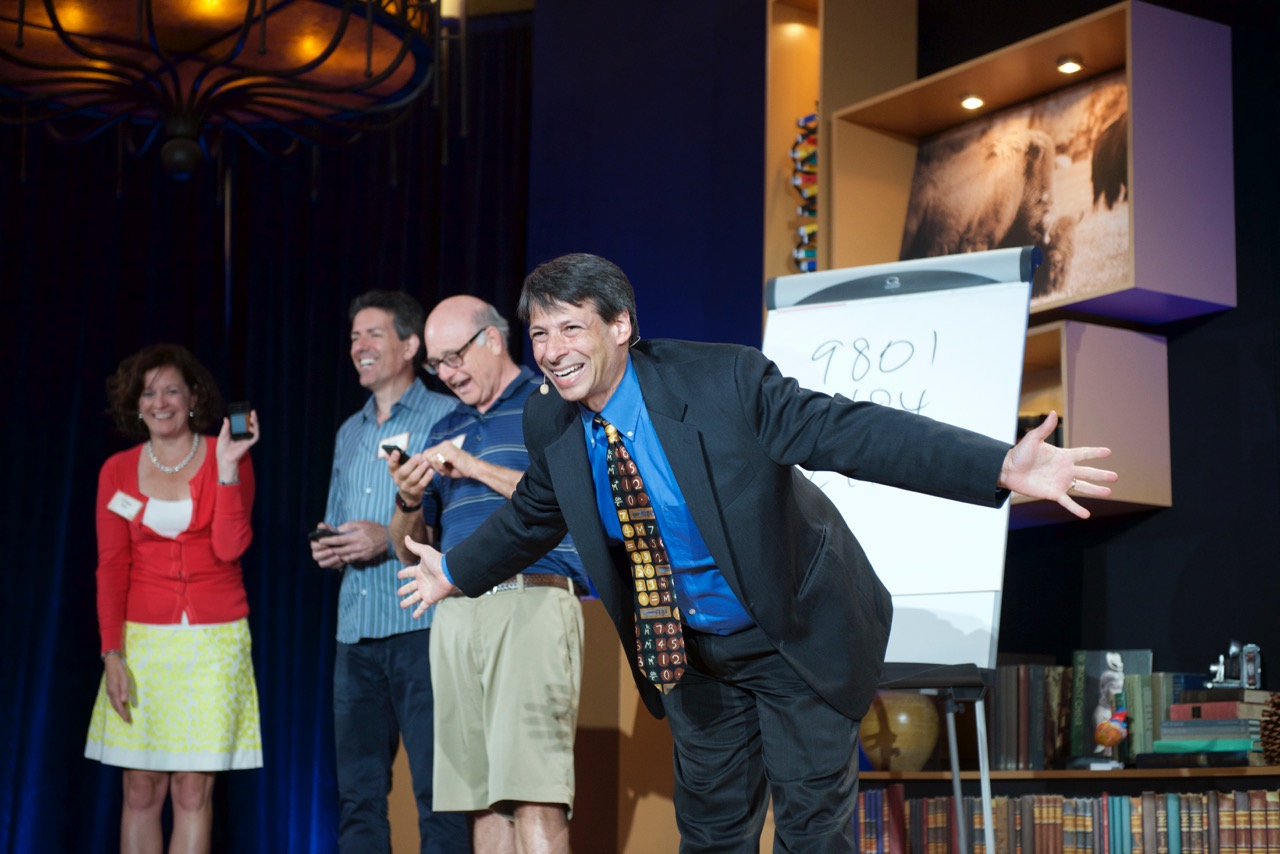
- Born: March 19, 1961 (age 65); Cleveland, Ohio, U.S.
- Education: Carnegie Mellon University; Johns Hopkins University
- Known for: Mental mathematics feats, Combinatorics, "Mathemagic"
- Awards: American Backgammon Tour Player of the Year 1997
- Scientific career
- Fields: Mathematics, combinatorics
- Workplaces: Harvey Mudd College
- Doctoral advisor: Alan J. Goldman

Arthur T. Benjamin (born March 19, 1961) is an American mathematician who specializes in combinatorics. Since 1989, he has been a professor of mathematics at Harvey Mudd College, where he is the Smallwood Family Professor of Mathematics.

He is known for mental math capabilities and "Mathemagics" performances in front of live audiences. His mathematical abilities have been highlighted in newspaper and magazine articles, at TED Talks and on the Colbert Report.

== Education ==
Benjamin earned a Bachelor of Science with highest honors in applied mathematics at Carnegie Mellon University in 1983. He then went on to receive a Master of Science in Engineering in 1985 and a Doctor of Philosophy in 1989 in mathematical sciences at Johns Hopkins University. His PhD dissertation was titled "Turnpike Structures for Optimal Maneuvers", and was supervised by Alan J. Goldman.

During his freshman year at CMU, he wrote the lyrics and created the magic effects for the musical comedy, Kije!, in collaboration with author Scott McGregor and composer Arthur Darrell Turner. This musical was the winner of an annual competition and was first performed as the CMU's Spring Musical in 1980.

== Career ==
=== Academic ===
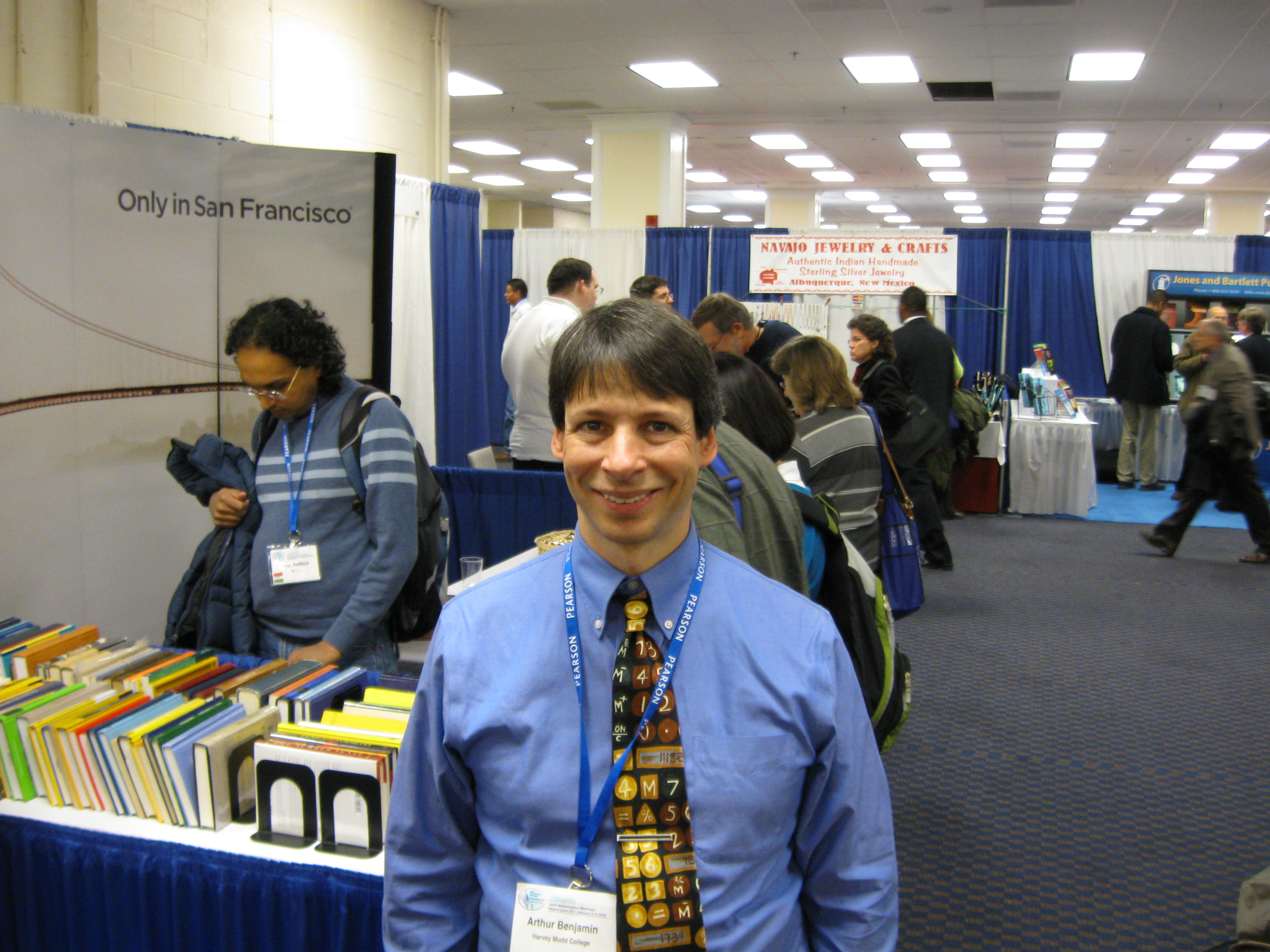
Arthur Benjamin at the Joint Mathematics Meetings in Washington, DC, January 2009.

Benjamin held several mathematics positions while attending university, including stints with the National Bureau of Standards, the National Security Agency, and the Institute for Defense Analyses. Upon receipt of his PhD, he was hired as an assistant professor of mathematics at Harvey Mudd College. He is currently a full professor at Harvey Mudd and was chair of the mathematics department from 2002 to 2004. He has published over 90 academic papers and five books. He has also filmed several sets of lectures on mathematical topics for The Great Courses series from The Teaching Company, including a course on The Joy of Mathematics, Discrete Mathematics, Mental Math, The Mathematics of Games and Puzzles, Math and Magic, and Fibonacci Numbers and the Golden Ratio. He served as co-editor of Math Horizons magazine for five years.

=== Mathemagics ===
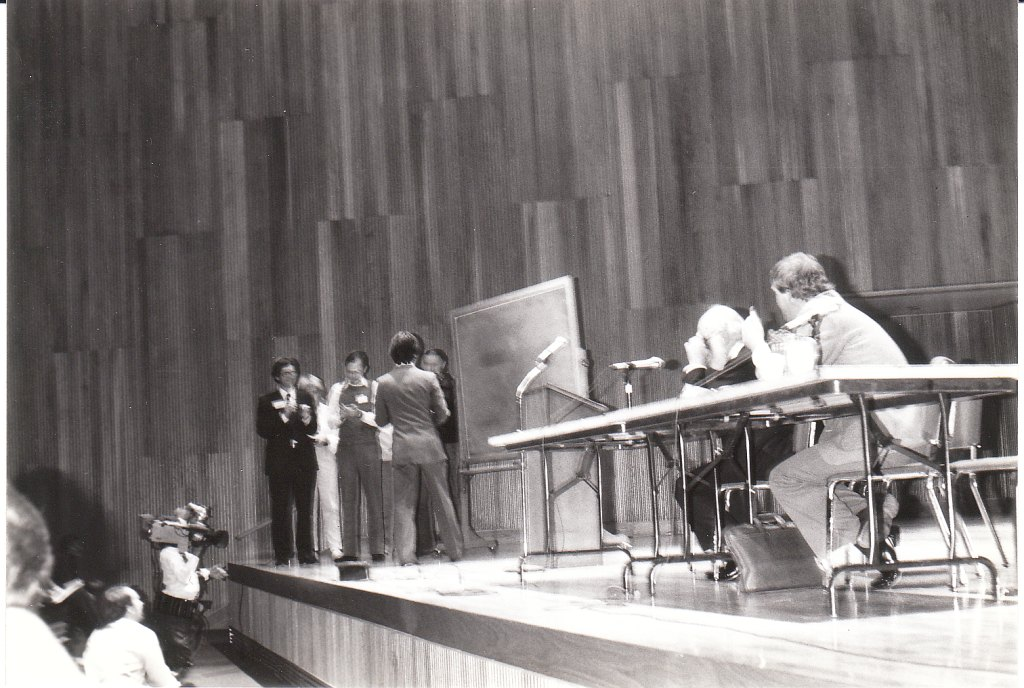
Arthur Benjamin performs at the 1983 CSICOP Conference in Buffalo, NY.

Benjamin has long had an interest in magic. While in college, he honed his skills as a magician and attended magic conferences. At one of these conferences, he met well-known magician and skeptic James Randi, who greatly influenced Benjamin's decision to perform Mathemagics shows for live audiences. Randi invited him to perform his mathematical tricks on a television program called Exploring Psychic Powers Live, co-hosted by Uri Geller. Randi also encouraged Benjamin to become involved in the growing skeptical movement. He attended early meetings of the Southern California Skeptics in the 1990s, which later evolved into the Skeptics Society. It was at these meetings that he met Skeptics Society President Michael Shermer, who would later become a co-author on three of Benjamin's books.

Benjamin regularly performs his Mathemagics program for live audiences at schools, colleges, conferences, and even at The Magic Castle in Hollywood, California. These shows feature Benjamin performing mathematical feats like rapidly squaring numbers with up to five digits and correctly identifying the day of the week on which audience members were born based on their birth dates.

He was also featured in Mathemagics, a multimedia disc released for the 3DO Interactive Multiplayer in 1994, which consists largely of short demonstrations and lessons by Benjamin in mental math and Mathemagics.

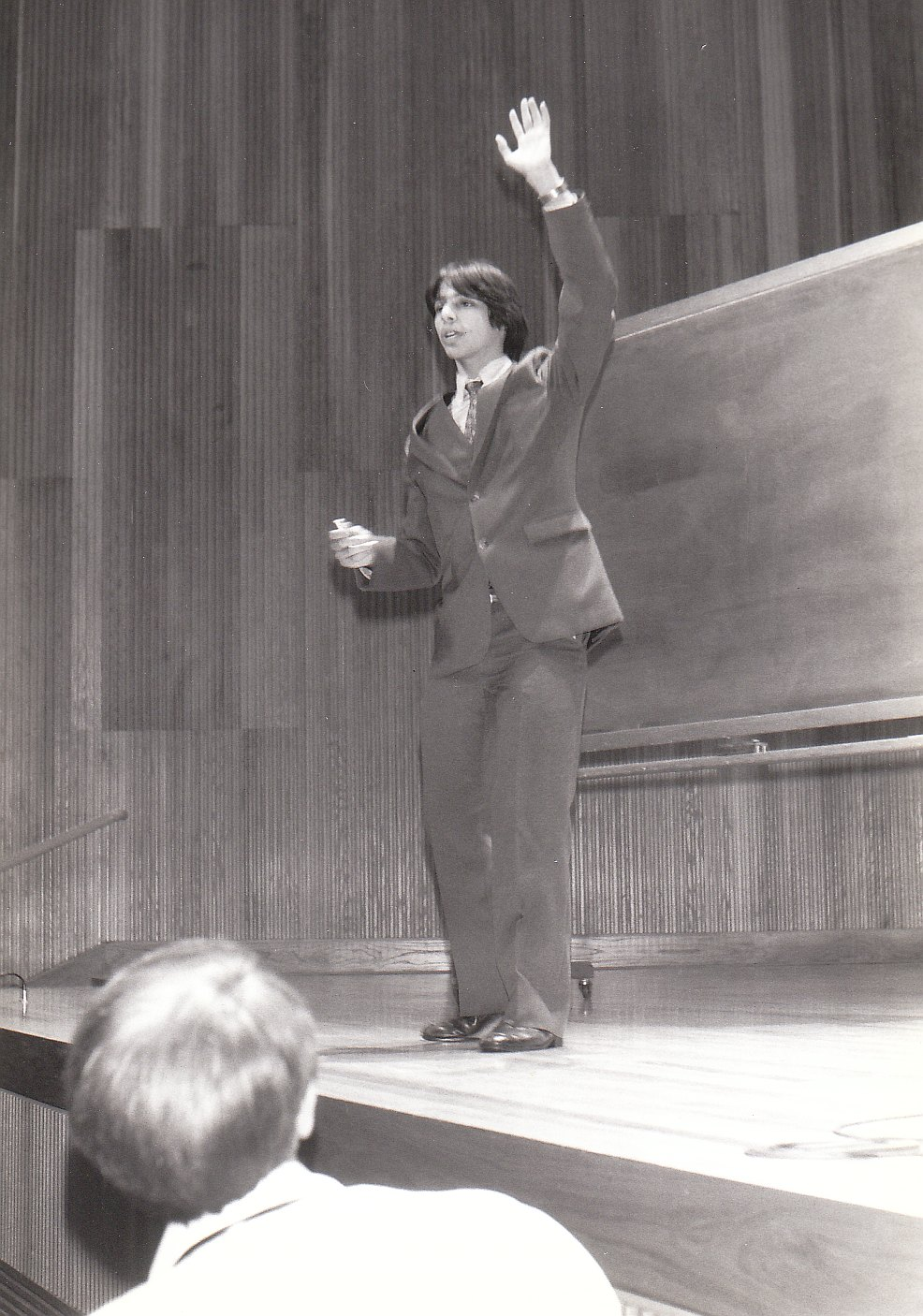
Arthur Benjamin performs at the 1983 CSICOP Conference in Buffalo, NY.

== Awards and honors ==
- American Backgammon Tour Player of the Year, 1997 and 2020 (online)
- Fellow of the Institute of Combinatorics and its Applications, 2000
- Deborah and Franklin Haimo Award for Distinguished College or University Teaching of Mathematics, Mathematical Association of America, 2000
- CHOICE Award, Outstanding Academic Title, for Proofs that Really Count: The Art of Combinatorial Proof, American Library Association, 2004
- Designated "America's Best Math Whiz" by Reader's Digest, May 2005
- Beckenbach Book Prize, for Proofs that Really Count, Mathematical Association of America, 2006
- George Pólya Lecturer, Mathematical Association of America, 2006-2008
- Selected by The Princeton Review as one of The Best 300 Professors, 2012
- American Backgammon Hall of Fame, 2022

== Media ==
Benjamin has appeared in three TED Talks. The first, in 2005, was a demonstration of his Mathemagics show. The second, in 2009, was a plea for improved math education in schools. The third, in 2013, was about the way the Fibonacci series of numbers provides an excellent example of the three most important reasons for studying mathematics: Calculation, Application, and Inspiration.

Benjamin hosted lectures in The Great Courses titled The Joy of Mathematics and Secrets of Mental Math.

He has appeared on numerous television programs throughout the years, including a notable performance on the Colbert Report in 2010. He has been profiled in over 100 articles in periodicals such as The New York Times, People, USA Today, and Scientific American.

== Bibliography ==
- Benjamin, Arthur T.; Shermer, Michael (1991). Teach Your Child Math: Making Math Fun for the Both of You. New York: McGraw Hill. ISBN 0737301341.
- Benjamin, Arthur T.; Shermer, Michael (1993). Mathemagics: How to Look like a Genius Without Really Trying. New York: McGraw Hill. ISBN 0929923545.
- Benjamin, Arthur T.; Quinn, Jennifer J. (2003). Proofs That Really Count: The Art of Combinatorial Proof. Washington DC: Mathematical Association of America. ISBN 0883853337.
- Benjamin, Arthur T.; Shermer, Michael (2006). Secrets of Mental Math: The Mathemagician's Guide to Lightning Calculation and Amazing Math Tricks. New York: Random House. ISBN 0307338401.
- Benjamin, Arthur T.; Brown, Ezra A. (2009). Biscuits of Number Theory. Washington DC: Mathematical Association of America. ISBN 978-0883853405.
- Benjamin, Arthur T. (2015). The Magic of Math: Solving for x and Figuring Out Why. New York: Basic Books. ISBN 978-0465054725.

== See also ==
- Mental calculators
- Mental calculations
- Mental Calculation World Cup
