= William O. Baker Award for Initiatives in Research =

Annual award by the National Academy of Sciences

The William O. Baker Award for Initiatives in Research, previously the NAS Award for Initiatives in Research, is awarded annually by the National Academy of Sciences "to recognize innovative young scientists and to encourage research likely to lead toward new capabilities for human benefit. The award is to be given to a citizen of the United States, preferably no older than 35 years of age. The field of presentation rotates among the physical sciences, engineering, and mathematics."

The award was established in 1981 in honor of William O. Baker by AT&T Bell Laboratories and is supported by Lucent Technologies.

== Recipients ==
Source: National Academy for Sciences

- Benjamin Recht (2015, statistics and machine learning) For his significant contributions at the confluence of optimization, signal processing and statistics, including seminal work on matrix completion.
- Garnet Kin-Lic Chan (2014, numerical simulations in condensed matter and materials) For pioneering research in the field of numerical simulation of highly correlated quantum systems in chemistry and physics, particularly for his development of density matrix renormalization group methods and the density matrix embedding theory.
- Theodore Betley (2013, catalysis) For his development and mechanistic elucidation of remarkable iron catalysts for carbon-hydrogen bond functionalization.
- Christopher Bettinger (2012, materials science) For innovative research on advanced materials for next-generation implanted medical devices.
- Martin T. Zanni (2011, optical sciences) For revolutionary advances in multidimensional spectroscopies, which are enabling discoveries in biological, medical, and condensed matter chemical systems.
- Mark Tygert (2010, numerical methods) For development of fast algorithms in mathematical physics, operator compression, and linear algebra, using deep, innovative ideas based on randomization and harmonic analysis.
- Ali Javey (2009, nanoscience) For seminal advances in carbon nanoelectronics, utilizing and synthesizing concepts from chemistry, physics, and engineering.
- Anna C. Gilbert (2008, computational science and applied mathematics) For innovative algorithms using wavelets and sampling techniques and their impact on data analysis and sparse approximation.
- Shanhui Fan (2007, optical science)

For innovative research on the theory and applications of photonic crystal devices.

- David Goldhaber-Gordon (2006, condensed matter/materials science)

For his fundamental studies of electron correlations in mesoscopic structures.

- Ronald Fedkiw (2005, computational science/applied mathematics )

For his many innovations in the modeling and numerical simulation of flows and his pioneering contributions to physically based computer graphics.

- Yoel Fink (2004, condensed matter/materials science)

For his pioneering contributions and ingenuity in the creative design and development of photonic materials and devices.

- David R. Karger (2003, algorithms and computation)

For the elegant use of randomness to design improved algorithms for classically studied problems such as network flow, graph coloring, finding minimum trees, and finding minimum cuts.

- Deborah S. Jin (2002, quantum electronics)

For her experimental realization and characterization of a new quantum system, the vapor-phase degenerate Fermi gas.

- Jon M. Kleinberg (2001, computational science/applied mathematics)

For his development of deep and innovative algorithms to solve fundamental problems in network, information extraction, and discrete optimization.

- Kenneth A. Farley (2000, geochemistry/geophysics)

For his insightful use of isotope geochemistry to address the origin of Earth's atmosphere, the infall of cosmic dust, and the uplift rates of mountains.

- Jennifer A. Doudna (1999, biomedical science)

For her pioneering studies, which have enabled the determination of complex RNA structures, especially those of ribozymes, through X-ray crystallography.

- Arthur W. Lupia (1998, social and political sciences)

For his contribution to our understanding of the importance of knowledge, learning, and persuasion to political decision-making by voters, legislators, and jurors.

- Matthew P. A. Fisher (1997, condensed matter physics)

For his seminal contributions to the theory of the vortex-glass phase, the superconductor-insulator transition, and the quantum properties of mesoscopic wires and n-leg Hubbard ladders.

- Christopher Stubbs (1996, astrophysics)

For his innovative development and utilization of instrumentation to attack fundamental issues in physics and astronomy, including the discovery of baryonic dark matter in the galactic halo.

- Thomas D. Albright (1995, systems neuroscience)

For his fundamental contributions to the understanding of motion perception through the creative integration of single-unit electrophysiology in monkeys, human psychophysics, and computational modeling.

- Joanne Chory (1994, plant molecular biology)

For her pioneering genetic and molecular approaches that have altered our understanding of how photomorphogenesis in plants is controlled by photoreceptor signal transduction pathways.

- R. Eric Betzig (1993, physics)

For his implementation of a near-field scanning optical microscope, which extends the resolution of optical microscopy far beyond the diffraction limit to dimensions as small as one-fortieth of an optical wavelength.

- Alice P. Gast (1992, chemical engineering)

For her innovative experimental and theoretical research of polymer and colloidal systems leading to discoveries of new microscopic phenomena.

- Sangtae Kim (1992, chemical engineering)

For his refinement of mathematical techniques in low Reynolds number hydrodynamics, and for his development of novel computer strategies for solving complex chemical engineering problems.

- Noam D. Elkies (1991, mathematics)

For his distinguished research in number theory, particularly his work on elliptic curves over the rational numbers and his remarkable constructions of dense sphere packings in Euclidean space.

- James G. Fujimoto (1990, quantum electronics)

For his contributions to femtosecond quantum electronics and applications of subpicosecond lasers to studies of electronic materials and biological tissues.

- Wayne H. Knox (1990, quantum electronics)

For his contributions to femtosecond quantum electronics and applications of subpicosecond lasers to study ultrafast processed in molecular systems and semiconductor heterostructures.

- John K. Ousterhout (1989, engineering)

For his outstanding achievements in the engineering of software ranging from operating systems to the computer-aided design of VLSI circuits.

- Marc L. Mansfield (1988, applied polymer chemistry and physics)

For his outstanding theoretical studies of the structure and properties of amorphous and semicrystalline polymers.

- Jeremy Nathans (1987, genetics)

For providing molecular genetic proof of the Young-Helmholtz trichromatic theory of color vision and for defining the changes in DNA in colorblindness.

- David R. Nelson (1986, materials science)

For his contributions to the understanding of imperfectly ordered systems including hexactics, liquid crystals, glasses, and icosahedral order in liquids.

- Steven E. Lindow (1985, applied biology)

For his pioneering research, demonstrating the role of epiphytic bacteria in ice nucleation and resultant frost damage to plants, the feasibility of biological as well as chemical control of frost injury, and the genetic control of ice nucleation in bacteria.

- Robert E. Tarjan (1984, computer science and engineering)

For his leadership in the subtle design of the most efficient algorithms known for many fundamental problems related to graphs and other combinatorial structures.

- Stephen M. Kosslyn (1983, behavioral and social sciences)

For his development of a comprehensive theory of visual imagery and its representation in the human memory system.

- Kerry E. Sieh (1982, geochemistry/geophysics)

For his development and application of innovative field techniques for studying active faults to identify and date paleoearthquakes, thereby providing quantitative assessment of earthquake hazards.

- Gary D. Patterson (1981, polymer science)

For his outstanding theoretical and experimental contributions to polymer science, particularly in the application of light scattering measurements to the understanding of polymer chain dynamics.
