= Hemispherical omnidirectional gimbaled wheel =

A hemispherical omnidirectional gimbaled wheel (HOG wheel) is a motor drive system utilizing a hemisphere continuously spinning and mounted on a gimbal. The axis of spin, perpendicular to the flat disk face on the hemisphere, can be oriented with different angles relative to the normal to the ground surface.

When the hemisphere axis is vertical, it acts like a spinning top and applies negligible torque to its contact point on a horizontal surface. When the axis is horizontal, with the hemisphere tipped on the disk perimeter, however, it pulls like a traditional circular wheel.

The torque can be quickly changed in any direction by tilting the hemisphere side-to-side and/or front-to-back. For example, if the hemisphere is spinning clockwise, tilting it to the right will "pull" the vehicle forward, tilting it to the left will "push" the vehicle backward, and front-to-back tilt will push left or right. Notably, the torque is proportional to the hemisphere's axial tilt, providing performance similar to an infinite gear ratio, but without any gears.

One limitation of the HOG wheel is its reliance on a single point of contact with the ground. This requires a flat, hard surface, especially for small robotic vehicles.

The October 1938 issue of Mechanics and Handicraft magazine featured a concept illustration of a HOG drive automobile called a "Hemisphere Drive Speedster." A personal vehicle utilizing a HOG drive made from Chinese woks won the 1988 Toyota Olympic Ideas competition. More recently, it has seen use in robotics, where it has also been called a "singularity drive" due to the lack of motion (a mechanical singularity) when the hemisphere axis is vertical.

== See also ==
- Odometry
