= Henry Mann =

Mathematician and statistician (1905–2000)

Henry Berthold Mann (27 October 1905 – 1 February 2000) was a professor of mathematics and statistics at the Ohio State University. Mann proved the Schnirelmann–Landau conjecture in number theory, and as a result earned the 1946 Cole Prize. He and his student D. Ransom Whitney developed the ("Mann–Whitney") U-statistic of nonparametric statistics. Mann published the first mathematical book on the design of experiments: Mann (1949).

== Early life of a number theorist ==
Born in Vienna, Austria-Hungary, to a Jewish family, Mann earned his Ph.D. degree in mathematics in 1935 from the University of Vienna under the supervision of Philipp Furtwängler. Mann immigrated to the United States in 1938, and lived in New York, supporting himself by tutoring students.

In additive number theory, Mann proved the Schnirelmann–Landau conjecture on the asymptotic density of sumsets in 1942. By doing so he established Mann's theorem and earned the 1946 Cole Prize.

== Statistics ==
In 1942 the Carnegie Foundation awarded Mann a fellowship to learn statistics while assisting the operations research group of Harold Hotelling at Columbia University. His group also supported Abraham Wald, and Wald and Mann collaborated on several papers. In statistics, Mann is known for the ("Mann–Whitney") U-statistic and its associated hypothesis test for nonparametric statistics. Collaborating with Wald, Mann developed the Mann–Wald theorem of asymptotic statistics and econometrics.

Mann wrote the first mathematical book on the design of experiments Mann (1949), whose principles allowed later statisticians to design and to analyze customized experiments. Like contemporary "self-help" and "how to" books, the earlier books gave easy-to-follow examples but little theory beyond exhortations to follow three principles of Ronald A. Fisher—to "replicate", to "establish control" (for example with blocking), and to "randomize" (assignment of treatments to units). Earlier books provided useful examples of designed experiments along with the design's analysis of variance, but no basis for constructing new designs for new problems, according to Johnson (1951).

According to Denis Conniffe:

Ronald A. Fisher was "interested in application and in the popularization of statistical methods and his early book Statistical Methods for Research Workers, published in 1925, went through many editions and motivated and influenced the practical use of statistics in many fields of study. His Design of Experiments (1935) [promoted] statistical technique and application. In that book he emphasized examples and how to design experiments systematically from a statistical point of view. The mathematical justification of the methods described was not stressed and, indeed, proofs were often barely sketched or omitted altogether ..., a fact which led H. B. Mann to fill the gaps with a rigorous mathematical treatment in his well known treatise, Mann (1949)."

== Later life ==
In 1946 Mann returned to Ohio State University, where he served as a professor of mathematics until his retirement in 1964. Mann then became a professor at the U.S. Army's Mathematics Research Center at the University of Wisconsin–Madison 1964–1971. Mann was professor at the University of Arizona from 1971 to 1975. His doctoral students include George Marsaglia and William Yslas Vélez.

== Publications ==
- Mann, Henry B. (1942). "A proof of the fundamental theorem on the density of sums of sets of positive integers". Annals of Mathematics. Second Series. 43 (3). Annals of Mathematics: 523–527. doi:10.2307/1968807. ISSN 0003-486X. JSTOR 1968807. MR 0006748.
- Mann, H. B.; Whitney, D. R. (1947). "On a Test of Whether one of Two Random Variables is Stochastically Larger than the Other". Annals of Mathematical Statistics. 18 (1): 50–60. doi:10.1214/aoms/1177730491. MR 0022058. Zbl 0041.26103.
- Mann, H. B. (1949). Analysis and design of experiments: Analysis of variance and analysis of variance designs. New York, N. Y.: Dover Publications, Inc. pp. x+195. MR 0032177.
- Mann, Henry B (1955). Introduction to algebraic number theory (With a chapter by Marshall Hall, Jr.). Columbus, Ohio: The Ohio State University Press. pp. vii+168. MR 0072174.
- Mann, Henry B. (1976). Addition theorems: The Addition theorems of group theory and number theory (Corrected reprint of 1965 Wiley ed.). Huntington, New York: Robert E. Krieger Publishing Company. ISBN 0-88275-418-1. MR 0424744.
