= Robert McCann (mathematician) =

Canadian applied mathematician

Robert J. McCann
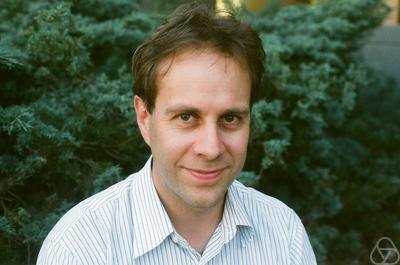
- McCann in Berkeley in 2013
- Education: Princeton University
- Awards: AMS Centennial Fellowship (1996); Monroe Martin Prize (2000); Coxeter–James Prize (2005); Jeffery–Williams Prize (2017); W.T. and Idalia Reid Prize (2023); Norbert Wiener Prize in Applied Mathematics (2025)
- Scientific career
- Fields: Applied mathematics
- Workplaces: University of Toronto
- Thesis: A Convexity Theory For Interacting Gases And Equilibrium Crystals (1994)
- Doctoral advisor: Elliott H. Lieb

Robert John McCann FRSC is a Canadian mathematician, known for his work in transportation theory. He has worked as a professor at the University of Toronto since 1998, and as Canada Research Chair in Mathematics, Economics, and Physics since 2020.

== Life and work ==
McCann was raised in Windsor, Ontario. He studied engineering and physics at Queen's University before graduating with a degree in math, and earned a PhD in mathematics from Princeton University in 1994. McCann was a Tamarkin Assistant Professor at Brown University from 1994, before joining the University of Toronto Department of Mathematics in the fall of 1998. He served as editor-in-chief of the Canadian Journal of Mathematics from 2007 to 2016, and again since 2022. He was an invited speaker at the International Congress of Mathematicians in Seoul in 2014. He was elected a Fellow of the American Mathematical Society in 2012, of the Royal Society of Canada in 2014, of the Fields Institute in 2015 and of the Canadian Mathematical Society in 2020. In 2025 he received the Norbert Wiener Prize in Applied Mathematics.
