= Margaret M. Robinson =

American mathematician

Margaret Maher Robinson is an American mathematician specializing in number theory and the theory of zeta functions. She was the Julia and Sarah Ann Adams Professor of Mathematics at Mount Holyoke College and is now Professor Emerita of Mathematics at Mount Holyoke College.

== Education and career ==
Robinson graduated from Bowdoin College in 1979, and earned her Ph.D. in 1986 from Johns Hopkins University. Her dissertation, On the Complex Powers Associated with the Twisted Cases of the Determinant and the Pfaffian, was supervised by Jun-Ichi Igusa.

She taught briefly at Hampshire College before joining the Mount Holyoke faculty.

== Recognition ==
In 2013 she was one of the winners of the Deborah and Franklin Haimo Awards for Distinguished College or University Teaching of Mathematics. Her award citation credited her undergraduate mentorship through Research Experiences for Undergraduates, and her intensive summer programs for young women in number theory.

In 2020, she was the recipient of the M. Gweneth Humphreys Award, given by the Association for Women in Mathematics. The award states that Robinson "has been a mainstay of thoughtful teaching and mentoring for many years at Mount Holyoke College, an institution whose mission is to educate women. Her focus is not just on the top students, but on making a meaningful (and joyful) mathematical intervention for all the generations of learners that have crossed her path." Robinson was selected as a Fellow of the Association for Women in Mathematics in the class of 2024 "for her support and empowerment of several generations of women in mathematics; for her mentoring within the Hudson River Undergraduate Mathematics Conference and the Carleton Summer Math Program; and for seeing the spark in each individual under her guidance and supporting them in the fulfillment of rewarding careers in mathematics."
