= Andrew M. Stuart =

British mathematician

Andrew Stuart FRS
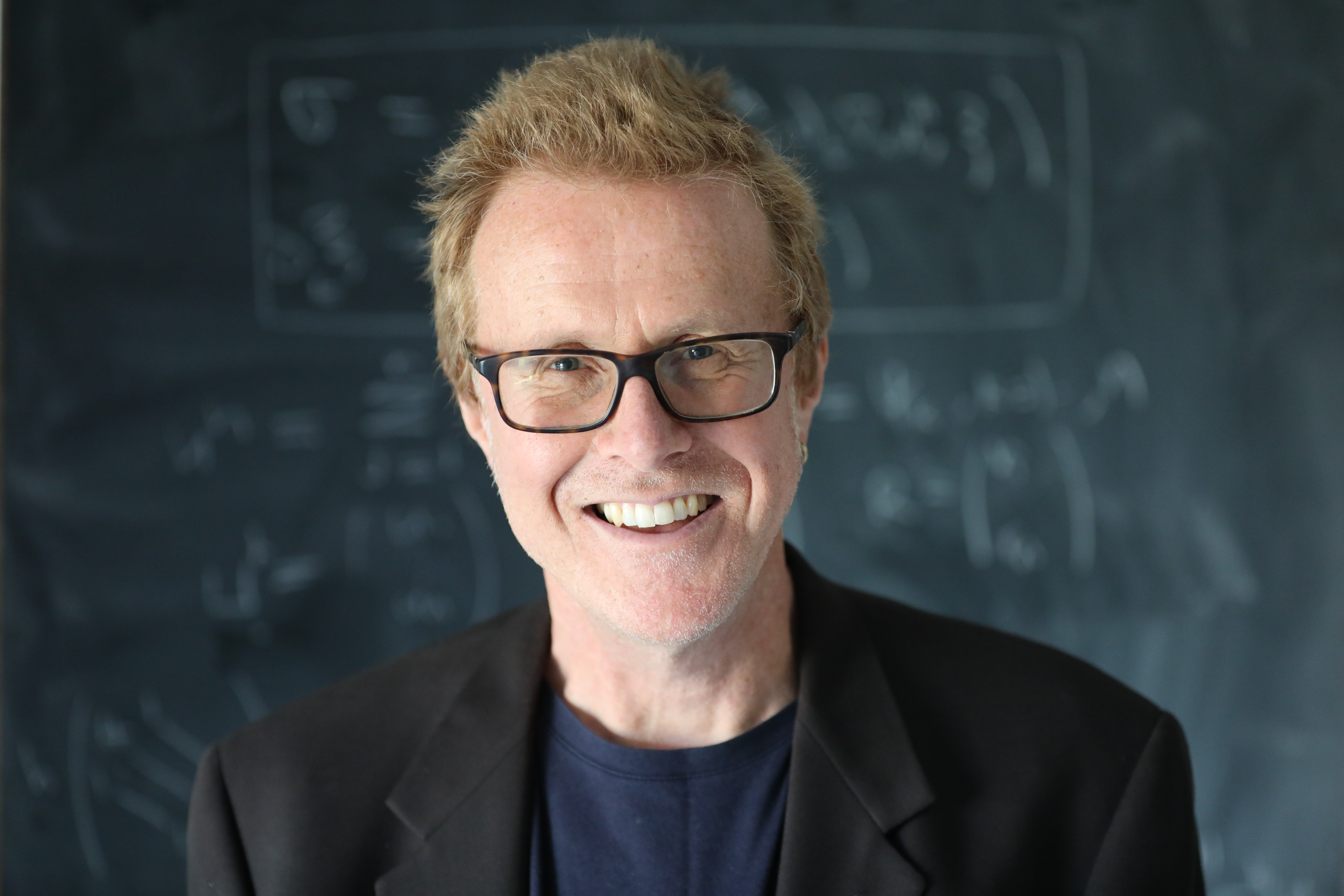
- Andrew Stuart, April 2022
- Born: Andrew M. Stuart
- Education: University of Bristol; University of Oxford
- Awards: Leslie Fox Prize for Numerical Analysis (1989); Monroe H. Martin Prize (1995); James H. Wilkinson Prize in Numerical Analysis and Scientific Computing (1997); Germund Dahlquist Prize (1997); Whitehead Prize (2000); J. D. Crawford Prize (2007)
- Scientific career
- Fields: Applied mathematics Computational mathematics
- Workplaces: MIT; University of Bath; Stanford University; Warwick University; California Institute of Technology; New York University
- Thesis: The mathematics of porous medium combustion (1986)
- Doctoral advisor: John Norbury

Andrew M. Stuart FRS is a British and American mathematician, working in applied and computational mathematics. In particular, his research has focused on the numerical analysis of dynamical systems, applications of stochastic differential equations and stochastic partial differential equations, the Bayesian approach to inverse problems, data assimilation, and machine learning.

== Education ==
Andrew Stuart graduated in mathematics from Bristol University in 1983, and then obtained his DPhil from the Oxford University Computing Laboratory in 1986.

== Career ==
After postdoctoral research in applied mathematics at Oxford and MIT, Stuart held permanent positions at the University of Bath (1989–1992), in mathematics, at Stanford University (1991–1999), in engineering, at Warwick University (1999–2016), in mathematics, at Caltech (2016–2026), in Computing and Mathematical Sciences . He is currently a Professor of Mathematics, and Chemical and Biological Engineering at New York University.

== Honors and awards ==
Stuart has been honored with several awards, including the 1989 Leslie Fox Prize for Numerical Analysis, the Monroe H. Martin Prize from the Institute for Physical Science and Technology at the University of Maryland, College Park, the SIAM James Wilkinson Prize, the SIAM Germund Dahlquist Prize in 1997, the Whitehead Prize from the London Mathematical Society in 2000, and the SIAM J.D. Crawford Prize in 2007. He was an invited speaker at the International Council for Industrial and Applied Mathematics (ICIAM) in Zurich in 2007 and Tokyo in 2023, and at the International Congress of Mathematicians (ICM) in Seoul, 2014. In 2009 he was elected an inaugural fellow of the Society for Industrial and Applied Mathematics (SIAM), and in 2020 he was elected a Fellow of the Royal Society. In 2022, he was named a Vannevar Bush Faculty Fellow.

== Publications ==
The majority of Stuart's published work is in academic journals. In addition to mathematics research published in journals, Stuart is also the author of several books in mathematics, including a research monograph concerning Dynamical Systems and Numerical Analysis, a research text on Multiscale Methods, a graduate text on Continuum Mechanics, a text on Data Assimilation, and a text on Inverse Problems.

- Stuart, A., Humphries, A.R. (1998). Dynamical Systems and Numerical Analysis. Cambridge University Press. ISBN 978-0-521-64563-8
- G. A. Pavliotis, Andrew Stuart (2008). Multiscale Methods: Averaging and Homogenization. Springer Science & Business Media. ISBN 978-0-387-73828-4
- Gonzalez, O., & Stuart, A. (2008). A First Course in Continuum Mechanics (Cambridge Texts in Applied Mathematics). Cambridge: Cambridge University Press. doi:10.1017/CBO9780511619571
- Kody Law, Andrew Stuart, Konstantinos Zygalakis (2015). Data Assimilation: A Mathematical Introduction. Springer. ISBN 978-3-319-20325-6
- Sanz-Alonso, D., Stuart, A., & Taeb, A. (2023). Inverse Problems and Data Assimilation (London Mathematical Society Student Texts). Cambridge: Cambridge University Press. ISBN 978-1-009-41431-9
