= Zhihong Xia =

Chinese-American mathematician

Zhihong "Jeff" Xia (Chinese: 夏志宏; pinyin: Xià Zhìhóng; born 20 September 1962, in Dongtai, Jiangsu, China) is a Chinese-American mathematician.

== Education and career ==
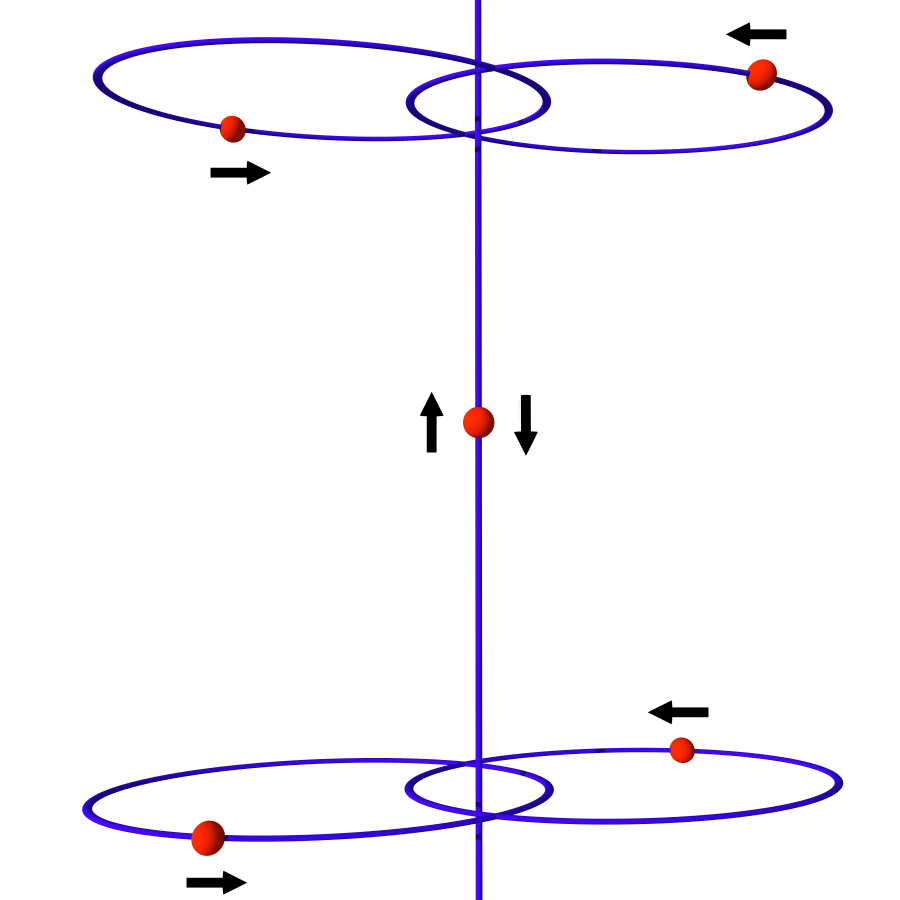
Xia's construction proving the Painlevé conjecture

Xia received, in 1982, from Nanjing University a bachelor's degree in astronomy and in 1988, a PhD in mathematics from Northwestern University with thesis advisor Donald G. Saari, for his thesis, The Existence of the Non-Collision Singularities. From 1988 to 1990, Xia was an assistant professor at Harvard University and from 1990 to 1994, an associate professor at Georgia Institute of Technology (and Institute Fellow). In 1994, he became a full professor at Northwestern University and since 2000, he has been the Arthur and Gladys Pancoe Professor of Mathematics.

His research deals with celestial mechanics, dynamical systems, Hamiltonian dynamics, and ergodic theory. In his dissertation, he solved the Painlevé conjecture, a long-standing problem posed in 1895 by Paul Painlevé. The problem concerns the existence of singularities of non-collision character in the $N$-body problem in three-dimensional space; Xia proved the existence for $N \geq 5$. For the existence proof, he constructed an example of five masses, of which four are separated into two pairs which revolve around each other in eccentric elliptical orbits about the z-axis of symmetry, and a fifth mass moves along the z-axis. For selected initial conditions, the fifth mass can be accelerated to an infinite velocity in a finite time interval (without any collision between the bodies involved in the example). The case $N = 4$ was open until 2014, when it was solved by Jinxin Xue. For $N = 3$, Painlevé had proven that the singularities (points of the orbit in which accelerations become infinite in a finite time interval) must be of the collision type. However, Painlevé's proof did not extend to the case $N > 3$.

In 1993, Xia was the inaugural winner of the Blumenthal Award of the American Mathematical Society. From 1989 to 1991, he was a Sloan Fellow. From 1993 to 1998, he received the National Young Investigator Award from the National Science Foundation. In 1995, he received the Monroe H. Martin Prize in Applied Mathematics from the University of Maryland. In 1998, he was an Invited Speaker of the International Congress of Mathematicians in Berlin.

== Selected publications ==
- Xia, Zhihong (1992). "The Existence of Noncollision Singularities in Newtonian Systems". Annals of Mathematics. Series 2. 135 (3): 411–468. doi:10.2307/2946572. JSTOR 2946572.
- Xia, Zhihong (1992). "Existence of invariant tori in volume-preserving diffeomorphisms". Ergodic Theory and Dynamical Systems. 12 (3): 621–631. doi:10.1017/S0143385700006969. S2CID 122761956.
- Xia, Zhihong (1992). "Melnikov method and transversal homoclinic points in the restricted three-body problem" (PDF). Journal of Differential Equations. 96 (1): 170–184. Bibcode:1992JDE....96..170X. doi:10.1016/0022-0396(92)90149-H.
- Saari, Donald G.; Xia, Zhihong (1993). "Off to Infinity in Finite Time" (PDF). Notices of the AMS. 42: 538–546. Archived from the original (PDF) on 2018-05-19.
- Xia, Z (1994). "Arnold diffusion and oscillatory solutions in the planar three-body problem". Journal of Differential Equations. 110 (2): 289–321. Bibcode:1994JDE...110..289X. doi:10.1006/jdeq.1994.1069.
- Saari, Donald G; Xia, Zhihong (1996). "Singularities in the Newtonian 𝑛-body problem". Hamiltonian Dynamics and Celestial Mechanics. Contemporary Mathematics. Vol. 198. American Mathematical Society. pp. 21–30. doi:10.1090/conm/198/02493. ISBN 978-0-8218-0566-4.
- Xia, Zhihong (1996). "Homoclinic points in symplectic and volume-preserving diffeomorphisms". Communications in Mathematical Physics. 177 (2): 435–449. Bibcode:1996CMaPh.177..435X. doi:10.1007/BF02101901. S2CID 17732615.
- Zhu, Deming; Xia, Zhihong (1998). "Bifurcations of heteroclinic loops". Science in China Series A: Mathematics. 41 (8): 837–848. Bibcode:1998ScChA..41..837Z. doi:10.1007/BF02871667. S2CID 120519869.
- Xia, Zhihong (2004). "Convex central configurations for the n-body problem". Journal of Differential Equations. 200 (2): 185–190. Bibcode:2004JDE...200..185X. doi:10.1016/j.jde.2003.10.001.
- Xia, Zhihong (2006). "Area-preserving surface diffeomorphisms". Communications in Mathematical Physics. 263 (3): 723–735. arXiv:math/0503223. Bibcode:2006CMaPh.263..723X. doi:10.1007/s00220-005-1514-3. S2CID 14540760.
- Saghin, Radu; Xia, Zhihong (2009). "Geometric expansion, Lyapunov exponents and foliations" (PDF). Annales de l'Institut Henri Poincaré C. 26 (2): 689–704. Bibcode:2009AIHPC..26..689S. doi:10.1016/j.anihpc.2008.07.001. S2CID 119147899.
- Xia, Zhihong; Zhang, Pengfei (2014). "Homoclinic points for convex billiards". Nonlinearity. 27 (6): 1181–1192. arXiv:1310.5279. Bibcode:2014Nonli..27.1181X. doi:10.1088/0951-7715/27/6/1181. S2CID 119627854.
- Xia, Zhihong; Zhang, Pengfei (2017). "Homoclinic intersections for geodesic flows on convex spheres". Dynamical Systems, Ergodic Theory, and Probability: in Memory of Kolya Chernov. Contemporary Mathematics. Vol. 698. American Mathematical Society. pp. 221–238. arXiv:1603.00667. doi:10.1090/conm/698. ISBN 978-1-4704-2773-3. Archived from the original on 2020-02-02.
