= Anne Greenbaum =

American applied mathematician and academic

- Born: 1951 (age 74–75)
- Education: University of California, Berkeley; University of Michigan
- Known for: Linear algebra
- Scientific career
- Fields: Mathematics
- Workplaces: University of Washington
- Doctoral advisor: Paul Concus and Beresford Neill Parlett

Anne Greenbaum (born 1951) is an American applied mathematician and professor at the University of Washington. She was named a SIAM Fellow in 2015 "for contributions to theoretical and numerical linear algebra". She has written graduate and undergraduate textbooks on numerical methods.

== Education ==
Greenbaum received her bachelor's degree from the University of Michigan in 1974. She earned her PhD from the University of California, Berkeley in 1981.

== Employment ==
After receiving her bachelor's degree, Greenbaum worked for the Lawrence Livermore National Laboratory. She joined the Courant Institute of Mathematical Sciences in 1986, and moved to the University of Washington in 1998.

== Awards and honors ==
Greenbaum received a Best Paper Prize from the SIAM Activity Group on Linear Algebra in 1994, together with Roland Freund, Noel Nachtigal, and Zdenek Strakos. She received the Bernard Bolzano Honorary Medal for Merit in the Mathematical Sciences from the Czech Academy of Sciences in 1997. She became a SIAM Fellow in 2015. She was selected as the 2022 AWM-SIAM Sonia Kovalevsky Lecturer.
