= Monroe H. Martin Prize =

Award in applied mathematics

The Monroe H. Martin Prize recognizes an outstanding paper in applied mathematics, including numerical analysis, by a young researcher not more than 35 years old and a resident of North America. First awarded in 1975, it is given every five years by the Institute for Physical Science and Technology at the University of Maryland, College Park. The prize commemorates the achievements of Monroe H. Martin, former director of the Institute for Fluid Dynamics and Applied Mathematics and chair of the Mathematics Department at the University of Maryland.

The prize carries a monetary award plus travel expenses; recipients present their work at the Monroe H. Martin Lecture at the University of Maryland.

== Recipients ==
The recipients of the Monroe H. Martin Prize are:

- 1975: Neil E. Berger
- 1980: Marshall Slemrod
- 1985: Jonathan Goodman
- 1990: Marek Rychlik
- 1995: Andrew M. Stuart, Zhihong Xia
- 2000: Robert J. McCann, Yury Grabovsky
- 2005: C. Sinan Güntürk, Jared Tanner
- 2010: Adam Oberman, Joel A. Tropp

== See also ==
- List of mathematics awards
