= Inderjit Dhillon =

Indian-American mathematician and computer scientist

Inderjit S. Dhillon
- Education: Indian Institute of Technology, Bombay (B.Tech.,1989); University of California, Berkeley (Ph.D.,1997)
- Known for: Bregman divergence Tridiagonal matrix factorisation
- Awards: AAAS Fellow (2016); ACM Fellow (2014); IEEE Fellow (2014); SIAM Fellow (2014); SIAM Linear Algebra Prize (2011); SIAM Outstanding Paper Prize (2011)
- Scientific career
- Fields: Machine Learning; Mathematical optimisation
- Workplaces: The University of Texas at Austin
- Thesis: A New O(n^2) Algorithm for the Symmetric Tridiagonal Eigenvalue/Eigenvector Problem (1997)
- Doctoral advisor: Beresford N. Parlett; James W. Demmel
- Doctoral students: Joel Tropp
- Website: https://www.cs.utexas.edu/~inderjit/

Inderjit Singh Dhillon (/ˈthɪloʊn/) is the Gottesman Family Centennial Professor of Computer Science and Mathematics and Director of the ICES Center for Big Data Analytics at the University of Texas at Austin. His main research interests are in machine learning, computational learning theory, mathematical optimisation, linear algebra, data analysis, parallel computing and network analysis.

== Biography ==
Dhillon received his B.Tech. degree from the Indian Institute of Technology, Bombay in 1989. He subsequently worked at AT&T Bell Laboratories as a Research Staff Member under Dr. Narendra Karmarkar. He received his Ph.D. from the University of California at Berkeley in 1997 under the direction of Beresford Parlett and James Demmel. He later joined the Computer Science faculty at the University of Texas at Austin in 1999.

== Academic works ==
Dhillon's main research interests are in machine learning, data analysis and computational mathematics. His emphasis is on developing novel algorithms that respect the underlying problem structure and are scalable to large data sets.

== Honors and awards ==
Dhillon is a fellow of the Association for Computing Machinery (ACM), a fellow of the Institute of Electrical and Electronics Engineers (IEEE), a fellow of the Society for Industrial and Applied Mathematics (SIAM), and a fellow of the American Association for the Advancement of Science (AAAS).
