= Allison Henrich =

American mathematician

Allison Henrich (born 1980) is an American mathematician specializing in knot theory and also interested in undergraduate-level mathematics research mentorship. She is a professor of mathematics at Seattle University.

== Education and career ==
Henrich entered college planning for an undergraduate teaching career, graduating in 2003 from the University of Washington with a double major in mathematics and philosophy. She completed a Ph.D. at Dartmouth College in 2008. Her dissertation, A Sequence of Degree One Vassiliev Invariants for Virtual Knots, was supervised by Vladimir Chernov. At Dartmouth, Carolyn S. Gordon became another faculty mentor.

She joined the Seattle University mathematics faculty in 2009, and was promoted to full professor in 2019.

== Books ==
Henrich is the coauthor of a book on knot theory, An Interactive Introduction to Knot Theory (with Inga Johnson, Dover Publications, 2017). She also coauthored the book A Mathematician’s Practical Guide to Mentoring Undergraduate Research (with Michael Dorff and Lara Pudwell, Mathematical Association of America, American Mathematical Society, and Council on Undergraduate Research, 2019).

With Emille D. Lawrence, Matthew Pons, and David Taylor, she co-edited the book Living Proof: Stories of Resilience Along the Mathematical Journey (American Mathematical Society and Mathematical Association of America, 2019). She is also an editor of Knots, Links, Spatial Graphs, and Algebraic Invariants (with Erica Flapan, Aaron Kaestner, and Sam Nelson, American Mathematical Society, 2017).

== Recognition ==
In 2015, the Mathematical Association of America gave Henrich their Henry L. Alder Award for Distinguished Teaching by a Beginning College or University Mathematics Faculty Member, and also their Paul R. Halmos – Lester R. Ford Award for expository excellence for her article "Unknotting unknots" coauthored with Louis Kauffman. The award citation for the Alder Award cited her work in interactive learning, in guiding undergraduate mathematics students to become mentors to elementary school students, and in founding a summer research program at for underrepresented undergraduates, hosted at Seattle University.
