= D. Ransom Whitney =

American mathematician (1915–2007)

Donald Ransom Whitney (November 27, 1915 – August 16, 2007) was an American mathematician best known as a co-author of the Mann-Whitney U test. Born in East Cleveland, Ohio, he held his BA from Oberlin College, where he met his future wife Marian, MA in Mathematics from Princeton University, and a PhD in Mathematics from The Ohio State University. From 1942 to 1946, Whitney served in the U.S. Navy, then earned his PhD and joined the Mathematics faculty of Ohio State University. There he collaborated with Henry Mann and both soon published their article “On a test of whether one of two random variables is stochastically larger than the other”, Ann. Math. Stat. 18 (1947), 50-60, one of the most cited articles in statistics ever.

Professor Whitney founded the Statistics Laboratory at The Ohio State University and later in 1970's served as Chairman of Statistics there. He was author or coauthor of three textbooks in mathematics and statistics and of many articles. He was a fellow of the American Statistical Association and the American Association for the Advancement of Science.
