= M. Helena Noronha =

Brazilian and American mathematics educator

Maria Helena Noronha is a Brazilian and American mathematics educator. She is a professor emerita at California State University, Northridge, where she has chaired the mathematics department and served as the university's associate vice provost for graduate studies, research, and international programs. She is known for founding and directing the Preparing Undergraduates through Mentoring for PhDs (PUMP) initiative across multiple campuses of the California State University system. Her mathematical research has concerned curvature in low-dimensional topology, and she is the author of a textbook on non-Euclidean geometry.

== Education and career ==
Noronha studied mathematics at the State University of Campinas, where she received a bachelor's degree in 1975, a master's degree in 1977, and a Ph.D. in 1983.

She emigrated to the United States in 1986, initially taking short-term research positions at the University of California, Santa Barbara, the University of California, San Diego, and the University of California, Los Angeles. She became a faculty member at the California State University, Northridge, in 1990, and was promoted to full professor in 1997. She took two leaves to serve as a program director at the National Science Foundation, in its program for Topology and Geometric Analysis, one from 2000 to 2002 and the second from 2009 to 2011. From 2006 to 2008 she was department chair, and in 2012 she was associate vice provost for graduate studies, research, and international programs. She retired to become a professor emerita in 2019.

At California State University, Northridge, Noronha founded several programs for mentoring students towards careers in mathematics, and especially students from the underrepresented groups that the university serves. These include the Preparing Undergraduates through Mentoring for PhDs (PUMP) program, founded in 2005, which spread beginning in 2013 from Northridge to the rest of the California State University system; Research Experiences in Community Colleges; and Fellows Engaged in Research in Mathematics to Assist Teachers, a program connecting master's students to primary and secondary school mathematics education. In 2014 she founded the Pacific Math Alliance, as a branch of the National Alliance for Doctoral Studies in the Mathematical Sciences, which has since become the Math Alliance within the American Mathematical Society.

== Book ==
Noronha is the author of Euclidean and non-Euclidean Geometries (Prentice Hall, 2002).

== Recognition ==
The PUMP program, founded and directed by Noronha, received the 2016 American Mathematical Society Award for an Exemplary Program or Achievement in a Mathematics Department. It was named as a 2017 Example of Excelencia in Education by the non-profit organization Excelencia in Education.

Noronha was the 2022 recipient of the M. Gweneth Humphreys Award of the Association for Women in Mathematics, given "in recognition of her outstanding mentoring of undergraduate women in mathematics, and her creation of programs and pathways for those under-represented in mathematics to excel and thrive in the profession".
