= Deanna Haunsperger =

American mathematician

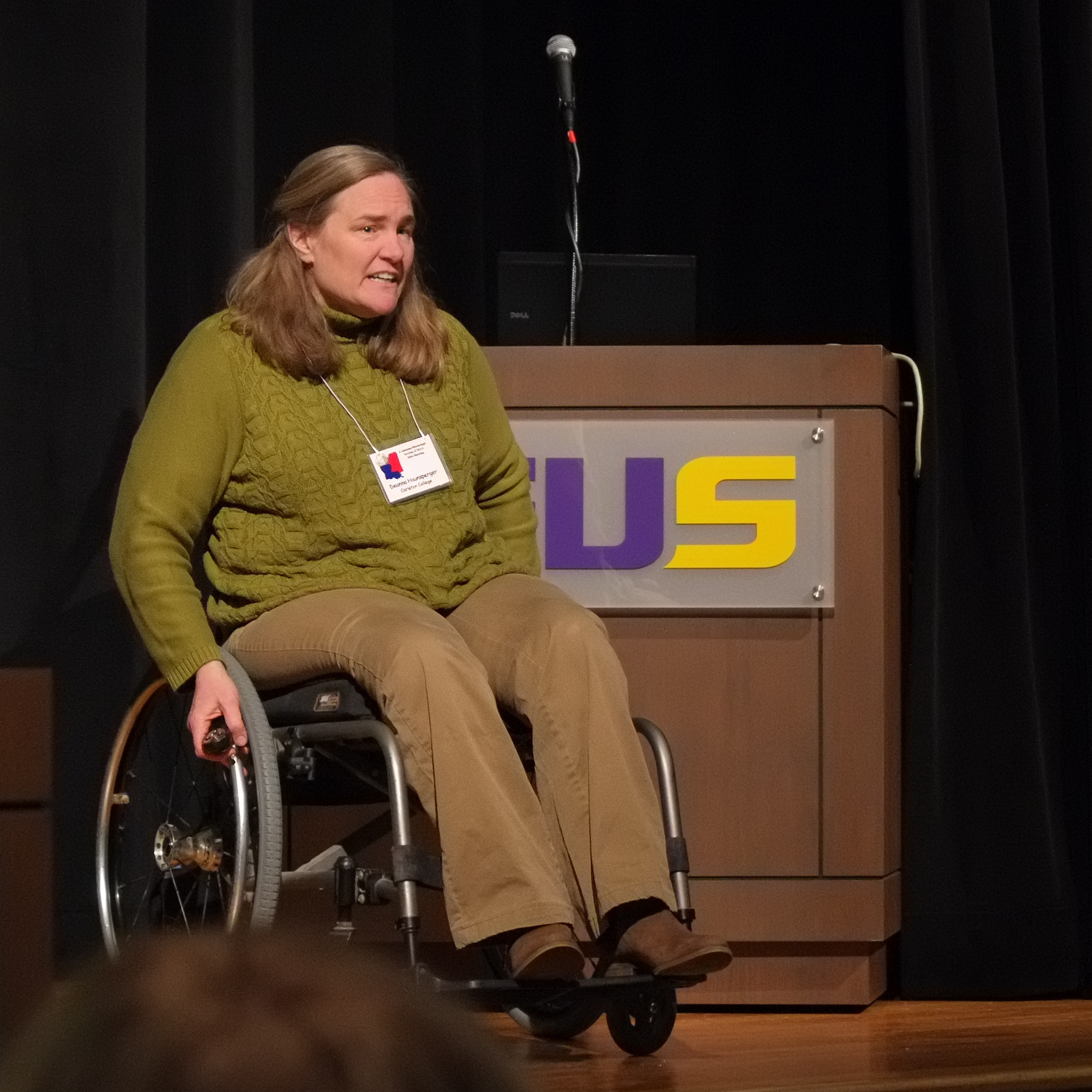
- Deanna Haunsperger in 2016
- Education: Simpson College; Northwestern University
- Awards: President, Mathematical Association of America (2017–2018); Association for Women in Mathematics Fellow (2017); Association for Women in Mathematics Presidential Award (2017); Association for Women in Mathematics Gweneth Humphreys Award (2012)
- Scientific career
- Fields: Mathematics, Statistics
- Workplaces: Carleton College
- Thesis: Projection and Aggregation Paradoxes in Nonparametrical Statistical Tests (1991)
- Doctoral advisor: Donald Gene Saari

Deanna Haunsperger (born 1964) is an American mathematician. She was the president of the Mathematical Association of America for the 2017–2018 term. She is a professor of mathematics at Carleton College.

== Education ==
Haunsperger received her B.A. in mathematics and computer science from Simpson College in 1986. She then received her master's degree in mathematics in 1989 and her Ph.D. in mathematics in 1991 from Northwestern University. Her dissertation was entitled Projection and Aggregation Paradoxes in Nonparametrical Statistical Tests and her advisor was Donald Gene Saari.

== Career ==
Haunsperger was an assistant professor of mathematics at St. Olaf College from 1991 to 1994. Since 1994, she has been a faculty member in the mathematics department at Carleton College.

From 1995 to 2014, Haunsperger and mathematician Stephen Kennedy directed the Carleton College Summer Mathematics Program for Women. This program worked to prepare undergraduate women to pursue a Ph.D. in mathematics.

== Awards and honors ==
From 1999 to 2003, Haunsperger and Kennedy were co-editors of Math Horizons, a magazine aimed at undergraduate students who are interested in mathematics.

Haunsperger was the second vice-president of the Mathematical Association of America (MAA) from 2006 to 2008. She was elected president of the MAA for the 2017–2018 term.

Haunsperger has won several awards from the Association for Women in Mathematics (AWM). In 2012, she was selected for the M. Gweneth Humphreys Award, which recognizes mathematics educators who have exhibited outstanding mentorship. She was presented with the second annual AWM Presidential Award in 2017. In 2017, she was selected as a fellow of the AWM in the inaugural class. She is the 2021 winner of the Yueh-Gin Gung and Dr. Charles Y. Hu Award for Distinguished Service to Mathematics of the Mathematical Association of America "for her prolific service to mathematics, including with the Mathematical Association of America; for her influential leadership of women in mathematics; for her long focus on inclusion and on building inclusive mathematical communities; and for a laudable career that has been rich in mathematical research, mathematical education, and mathematical exposition".
