= M. Gweneth Humphreys Award =

The M. Gweneth Humphreys Award or Humphreys Award is a mathematics award established by the Association for Women in Mathematics in recognition of mathematics educators who have exhibited outstanding mentorship. The award is named for Mabel Gweneth Humphreys (1911-2006) who earned her Ph.D. at age 23 from the University of Chicago in 1935. She taught mathematics to women for her entire career, first at Mount St. Scholastica College, then for several years at Sophie Newcomb College, and finally for over thirty years at Randolph Macon Woman's College. This award, funded by contributions from her former students and colleagues at Randolph-Macon Woman's College, recognizes her commitment to and her influence on undergraduate students of mathematics.

== Recipients ==
The following mathematicians have been honored with the Humphreys Award:

Year	Recipient
2026	Anant P. Godbole
2025	Dewey Taylor
2024	Maria Cristina Villalobos
2023	Erika Tatiana Camacho
2022	Maria Helena Noronha
2021	Raegan Higgins
2020	Margaret M. Robinson
2019	Suzanne Weekes
2018	Erica Flapan
2017	Helen G. Grundman
2016	Naomi Jochnowitz
2015	Ruth Haas
2014	William Yslas Vélez
2013	James A. Morrow
2012	Deanna Haunsperger
2011	Rhonda Hughes

== See also ==
- List of mathematics awards
