= William Yslas Vélez =

American mathematician

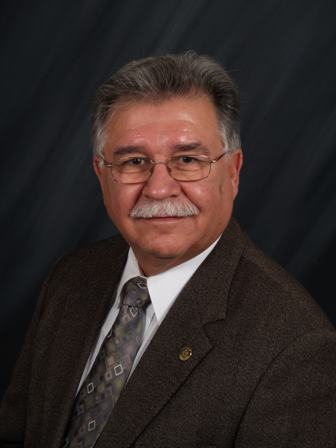
- Headshot of Vélez in August 2010
- Born: Tucson, Arizona
- Education: The University of Arizona (BS, MS, PhD)
- Spouse: Bernice Lopez Vélez
- Children: 2
- Awards: Presidential Award for Excellence in Science, Mathematics, and Engineering Mentoring (1997)
- Scientific career
- Fields: Mathematics
- Institutions: The University of Arizona
- Thesis: A basis for the group of units modulo ρ^{m} and prime ideal decomposition in F(ρ 1/m)
- Doctoral advisor: Henry Mann

William "Bill" Yslas Vélez is an American mathematician, a current Emeritus Professor at the University of Arizona, and an Elected Fellow of the American Association for the Advancement of Science. From 1992–96, Vélez served as the president of Society for the Advancement of Chicanos/Hispanics and Native Americans in Science (SACNAS).

At the University of Arizona he graduated with B.Sc. in 1968, M.Sc. in 1972, and Ph.D. in 1975. His doctoral thesis was written under the supervision of H. B. Mann. Vélez became a Fellow of the American Mathematical Society in January 2013. In 2017, he was selected as a fellow of the Association for Women in Mathematics in the inaugural class.

In 2014, Vélez won the M. Gweneth Humphreys Award of the Association for Women in Mathematics for his mentorship of mathematics students and particularly of women in mathematics.

== Notable publications ==
=== Patents ===
- Method and apparatus for suppressing interference from bandspread communication signals, (1996).
- Method and apparatus for suppressing linear amplitude interference from bandspread communication signals, (1996).
- Simplified interference suppressor, (2000).
- Adaptive processor integrator for interference suppression, (2001).
