= Anna C. Gilbert =

American mathematician

Anna Catherine Gilbert
- Born: 1972 (age 53–54)
- Awards: NAS Award for Initiatives in Research

Academic background
- Education: University of Chicago
- Alma mater: Princeton University
- Doctoral advisor: Ingrid Daubechies

Academic work
- Discipline: Mathematician
- Institutions: University of Michigan

Anna Catherine Gilbert (born 1972) is an American mathematician who works as the John C. Malone Professor of Statistics & Data Science, Applied Mathematics, and Electrical Engineering at Yale University. She was previously a professor at the University of Michigan. Her research expertise is in randomized algorithms for harmonic analysis, image processing, signal processing, and large data sets.

== Education and career ==
Gilbert earned a bachelor's degree from the University of Chicago in 1993, and completed her Ph.D. in 1997 from Princeton University under the supervision of Ingrid Daubechies. After postdoctoral research at Yale University, she joined AT&T Labs, and continued there as a staff member until 2004, when she moved to Michigan.

== Research ==
Gilbert's research discoveries have included the existence of multifractal behavior in TCP-based internet traffic, the development of streaming algorithms based on random projections for aggregating information from large data streams using very small amounts of working memory, and a foundational analysis of the ability of orthogonal matching pursuit to recover sparse signals with her student Joel Tropp. In 2026, Gilbert along with other experts in STEM backgrounds from different educational institutions have gathered under TEMPEST, a science and research center at Michigan State University funded by the National Science Foundation to better understand turbulence.

== Recognition ==
She became a Sloan Fellow in 2006. In addition to that, she won the NSF (National Science Foundation) Career award in 2006 (12). In 2008, she was awarded the NAS Award for Initiatives in Research and the Association for Computing Machinery Douglas Engelbart Award. She also won the Signal Processing Best Paper award alongside Martin Strauss and Joel Tropp in 2010 from the European Association for Signal Processing. In 2013 she won the Ralph E. Kleinman Prize of the Society for Industrial and Applied Mathematics "for her creative and deep contributions to the mathematics of signal processing, data analysis and communications". She was an invited speaker at the International Congress of Mathematicians in 2014, speaking on "Mathematics in Science and Technology". She gave the von Neumann Lecture at the 2022 Joint Mathematics Meeting, titled "Metric representations: Algorithms and Geometry." She also was named the Herman H. Goldstine Collegiate Professor of Mathematics in January of 2015 by the University of Michagan College of Literature, Science, and the Arts' mathematic division.
