= Kenneth Farley =

American geochemist

Kenneth A. Farley is a noble gas isotope geochemist and Professor of Geochemistry at the California Institute of Technology. He holds the W. M. Keck Foundation professorship and was the chairman of the Division of Geological and Planetary Sciences at Caltech from 2004 to 2014. Farley specializes in the study of the accumulation of cosmic dust in seafloor sediments through analysis of the presence of Helium-3, and in the isotopic composition of mid-oceanic and volcanic island basalts.

Farley earned a B.S. in chemistry at Yale University in 1986 and his Ph.D. in geochemistry at the University of California, San Diego in 1991 under the guidance of Scripps Institution of Oceanography geochemist Harmon Craig.

In 2000 he was awarded the National Academy of Science Award for Initiatives in Research. He is a member of both the National Academy of Science and the American Academy of Arts and Sciences.

Since 2013 he has been project scientist for NASA's Mars 2020 Perseverance rover mission.
