= Erica Flapan =

American mathematician (born 1956)

- Born: August 14, 1956 (age 70)
- Occupations: Professor, mathematician
- Title: Lingurn H. Burkhead Professor of Mathematics

Academic background
- Education: University of Wisconsin–Madison
- Thesis: Non-Periodic Knots and Homology Spheres (1983)
- Doctoral advisor: Daniel McMillan
- Website: pages.pomona.edu/~elf04747/

Erica Flapan (born August 14, 1956) is an American mathematician and the Lingurn H. Burkhead Professor of Mathematics at Pomona College. She is a fellow of the American Mathematical Society and former editor-in-chief of their monthly Notices journal.

== Education and career ==
Flapan did her undergraduate studies at Hamilton College, graduating in 1977, and went on to graduate studies at the University of Wisconsin–Madison, earning a Ph.D. in 1983 under the supervision of Daniel McMillan.

After postdoctoral studies at Rice University and the University of California, Santa Barbara she joined the Pomona faculty in 1986. Flapan's research is in low-dimensional topology and knot theory.

== Books ==
Flapan is the author or coauthor of books including:

- When Topology Meets Chemistry: A Topological Look at Molecular Chirality (Cambridge University Press and Mathematical Association of America, 2000)
- Number Theory: A Lively Introduction with Proofs, Applications, and Stories (with James Pommersheim and Tim Marks, John Wiley & Sons, 2010)
- Knots, Molecules, and the Universe: An Introduction to Topology (2015)

Her edited volumes include Applications of Knot Theory (with Dorothy Buck, 2009), Knots, Links, Spatial Graphs, and Algebraic Invariants (with Allison Henrich, Aaron Kaestner, and Sam Nelson, 2017), and Topology and Geometry of Biopolymers (with Helen Wong, 2018).

== Recognition ==
In 2011, Flapan was one of three winners of the Deborah and Franklin Haimo Award for Distinguished College or University Teaching of Mathematics, from the Mathematical Association of America. In 2012 she became a fellow of the American Mathematical Society, and in the same year as part of the bicentennial of Hamilton College was honored with a Hamilton Alumni Achievement Medal. In recognition of her devotion to mentoring, Flapan won the M. Gweneth Humphreys Award from the Association for Women in Mathematics in 2018. She delivered the Chan Stanek Lecture for Students at MathFest 2021.
