= Mabel Gweneth Humphreys =

Canadian-American mathematician and academic

- Born: October 22, 1911; South Vancouver, British Columbia, Canada
- Died: October 6, 2006 (aged 94); Lynchburg, Virginia, USA
- Education: University of Chicago
- Known for: M. Gweneth Humphreys Award
- Awards: Governor General's Academic Medal (1932)
- Scientific career
- Fields: Mathematics, Number Theory
- Workplaces: Mount St. Scholastica College, Sophie Newcomb College, Randolph-Macon Woman's College
- Doctoral advisor: Leonard Eugene Dickson

Mabel Gweneth Humphreys (1911-2006) was a Canadian-American mathematician and Professor of Mathematics at Randolph-Macon Woman's College. The M. Gweneth Humphreys Award of the Association for Women in Mathematics was established in her honor.

== Education ==
Humphreys attended North Vancouver High School from 1925 to 1928. She received her Bachelor of Arts with honors in mathematics from the University of British Columbia in 1932, where she held scholarships for all four years. She studied at Smith College under Susan Miller Rambo, among others. She earned a master's degree in mathematics in 1933. She received her Ph.D. in mathematics from the University of Chicago in 1935. Her dissertation was entitled On the Waring Problem with Polynomial Summands and her advisor was Leonard Eugene Dickson.

== Career ==
In 1981, Humphreys described her first attempts to find a job after completing her Ph.D.:

I had hoped that the University of Chicago would hear about a job for me, but only one came through, and the male candidate who got his thesis at the same time got that job. In the meantime, I had registered at a teacher’s agency in downtown Chicago, and many cards came in for the sum of something like $900, and you taught all the mathematics in the four years, and you were dean of women, or all of mathematics and coach some sport. I said to myself I wasn’t going to do this; I was going to stick around in Chicago and wait tables somewhere and study more mathematics. After awhile a card came through from Kansas, a woman’s college, and they needed a woman with a Ph.D. in either mathematics or physics to teach both. This was a substitute position, which was vacant because Sr. Helen Sullivan ... was ill. I took that and taught there for that one year. I was very busy I must say, but it was a great apprenticeship. I enjoyed it very much.

— Mabel Gweneth Humphreys (1981)

From 1935 to 1936, Humphreys was an instructor of mathematics and physics at Mount St. Scholastica College. She began teaching at H. Sophie Newcomb Memorial College in 1936 and was promoted to assistant professor in 1941. She was also an assistant professor at Barnard College in the summer of 1944, and an assistant professor at Tulane University in the summer of 1946.

In 1949, Humphreys became an associate professor of mathematics at Randolph-Macon Woman's College in Lynchburg, Virginia. After one year at Randolph-Macon, she was named Gillie A. Larew Professor and head of the mathematics department. She was head of the department until 1979. For the 1955-1956 academic year, Humphreys went on sabbatical leave to the University of British Columbia (UBC). During this time, she visited undergraduate mathematics programs at several colleges and universities to examine their methods. From 1962 to 1963, she was a visiting professor at UBC as a National Science Foundation (NSF) faculty fellow.

In the summers, Humphreys taught high school teachers at NSF summer institutes. From 1965 to 1969, Humphreys worked for the Educational Testing Service. She was also a consultant in 1975 for the American Council on Education regarding mathematics course credit given by nonacademic organizations. Humphreys was an active member of the Mathematical Association of America at both the sectional and national levels.

== Awards and legacy ==
Humphreys earned the Governor General's Gold Medal in 1932, which was awarded to the college student with the highest grade point average in Canada.

The M. Gweneth Humphreys Award of the Association for Women in Mathematics is named in her honor. Each year, this award is presented to a mathematics educator who has encouraged women undergraduates to pursue mathematical careers.

== Personal life ==
Humphreys was born on October 22, 1911 in South Vancouver, British Columbia. Her mother, Mabel Jane Thomas (1885-1963), was born in London, England, and worked as a dressmaker and a florist. Her father was Richard Humphreys (1880-1969), a machinist who was born in Pwllheli, Wales. Her parents were married in 1910, and Humphreys was their only child. In 1941, Humphreys became a naturalized U.S. citizen.

Humphreys' hobbies included gardening and reading. She was an active member of the Natural Bridge Appalachian Trail Club. She lived in Lynchburg, Virginia, through her retirement in 1980 until her death on October 6, 2006.
