= Ruth Haas =

American mathematician and academic

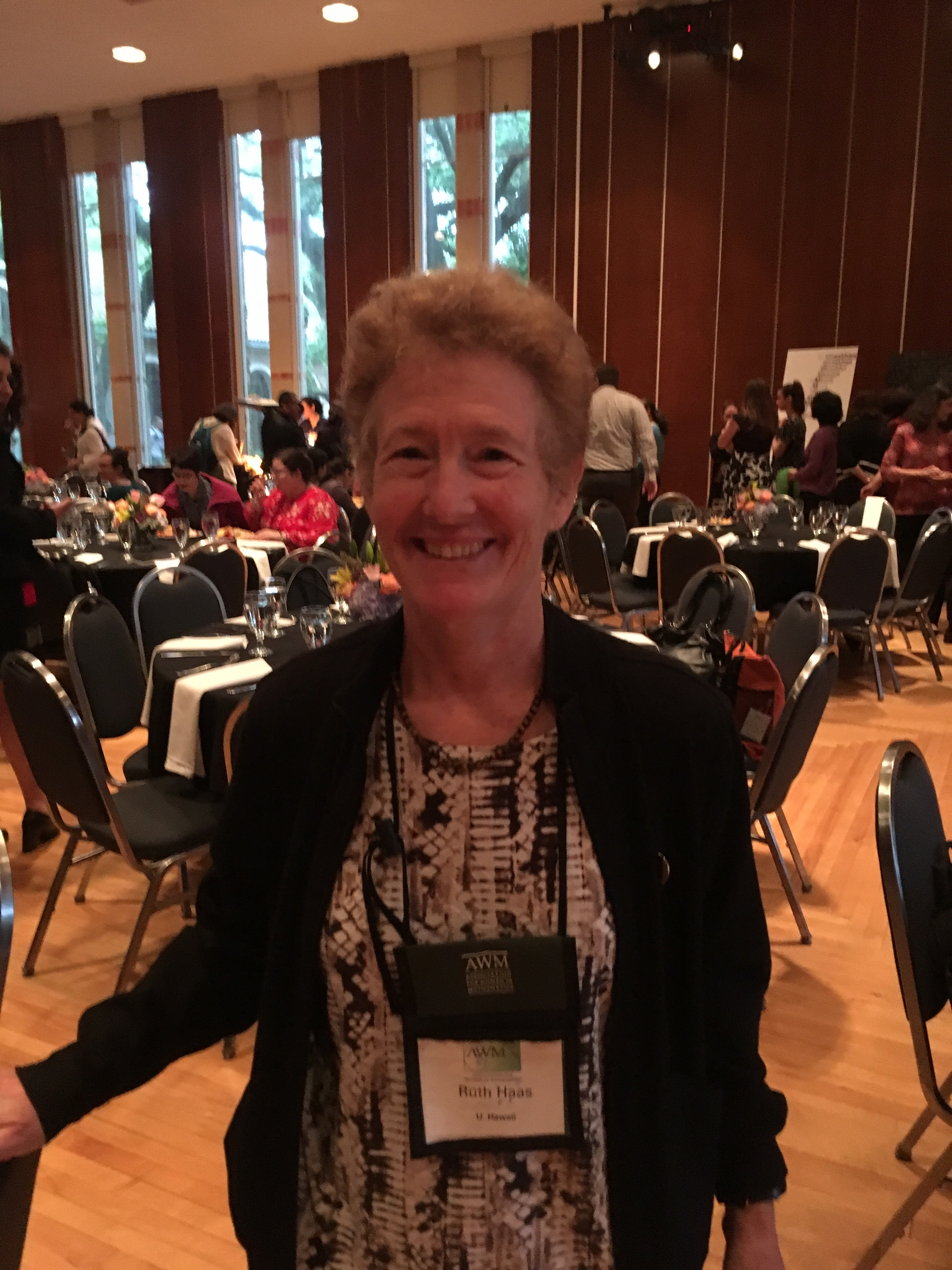
- Ruth Haas at AWM Research Symposium, 2019
- Education: Swarthmore College (BA); Cornell University (MS, PhD)
- Awards: M. Gweneth Humphreys Award (2015)
- Scientific career
- Fields: Mathematics
- Workplaces: Smith College; University of Hawaii at Manoa
- Thesis: Dimension and Bases for Certain Classes of Splines: A Combinatorial and Homological Approach (1987)
- Doctoral advisor: Louis Billera
- Website: math.hawaii.edu/wordpress/people/rhaas/

Ruth Haas is an American mathematician and professor at the University of Hawaii at Manoa. Previously she was the Achilles Professor of Mathematics at Smith College. She received the M. Gweneth Humphreys Award from the Association for Women in Mathematics (AWM) in 2015 for her mentorship of women in mathematics. Haas was named an inaugural AWM Fellow in 2017. In 2017 she was elected President of the AWM and on February 1, 2019 she assumed that position.

== Education ==
Haas received her Bachelor of Arts from Swarthmore College, her Master of Science from Cornell University, and her Ph.D. from Cornell University in 1987. Prior to becoming a professor at the University of Hawaii, Haas was Achilles Professor of Mathematics and Statistics at Smith College.

== Career ==
Ruth Haas taught at Smith College for many years. She was instrumental in establishing the Center for Women in Mathematics and the post-baccalaureate program at Smith. She has developed and supported several other initiatives, including an undergraduate research course, the annual Women In Mathematics In the Northeast (WIMIN) conference, a program for junior visitors, a high school outreach program, and weekly seminars. The AWM honored Ruth Haas’s outstanding achievements in inspiring undergraduate women to discover and pursue their passion for mathematics and eventually becoming mathematicians by awarding her the 2015 M. Gweneth Humphreys Award.
