= Suzan Rose Benedict =

American mathematician

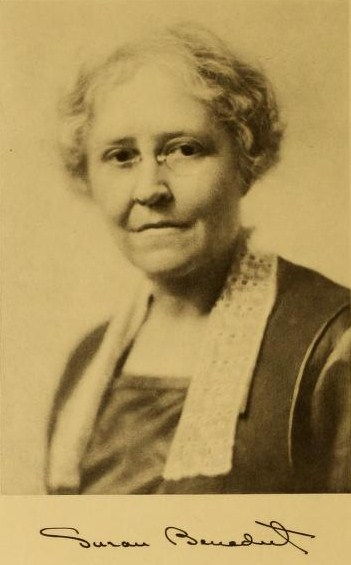
- Benedict in 1922
- Born: November 29, 1873; Norwalk, Ohio, U.S.
- Died: April 8, 1942 (aged 68); Northampton, Massachusetts, U.S.
- Education: Smith College; Columbia University; University of Michigan
- Scientific career
- Fields: Mathematics
- Workplaces: Smith College
- Thesis: A Comparative Study of the Early Treatises Introducing into Europe the Hindu Art of Reckoning (1914)
- Doctoral advisor: Louis Charles Karpinski

Suzan Rose Benedict (November 29, 1873 – April 8, 1942), sometimes spelled Susan Rose Benedict, was the first woman awarded a Ph.D. in Mathematics from the University of Michigan and had a long teaching career at Smith College.

== Early life and education ==
Benedict was born in Norwalk, Ohio, the youngest of seven children of David DeForrest Benedict, MD and Harriott Melvina Benedict (née Deaver). Dr. Benedict had been a Union Surgeon in the American Civil War. She was a niece of oil magnate and philanthropist, Louis Severance.

After graduating high school in Norwalk, she entered Smith College in 1891. She graduated in 1895 with a major in Chemistry and minors in Mathematics, German, and Physics, then returned to Norwalk and taught Mathematics until 1905, when she began graduate studies at Teacher's College, Columbia University. She received a M.A. in Mathematics from Columbia in 1906. That same year she joined the Mathematics Department at Smith College as an assistant in Mathematics and rose to become an instructor the following year.

The summers of 1911 through 1913, she resumed her graduate studies at the University of Michigan and in 1913–14 she took a leave of absence from Smith to finish her dissertation directed by Louis Charles Karpinski: “A Comparative Study of the Early Treatises Introducing into Europe the Hindu Art of Reckoning.” She received her PhD in 1914.

== Career at Smith College ==
Benedict returned to Smith as an associate professor after receiving her PhD. She was promoted to professor in 1921. From 1918 to 1928 she was Dean of Students and she served as chairman of the Mathematics department from 1928 to 1934. Her first love was teaching. In May 1940, she wrote to Helen Owens, an instructor in mathematics at Pennsylvania State College: "it was not modesty that prevented my sending you a long list of published papers, but a scarcity of such papers. I have lost track of the very few I have written, as I have been much more interested in teaching and administration than in research."

In February 1942, she retired as professor emeritus, intending to support the war effort by volunteering with the Red Cross. Two months later, she was stricken with a heart attack and died at age 68.

Benedict never married. From 1918, she shared a home with Susan Miller Rambo, a colleague in the Mathematics Department at Smith College and the second woman to receive a PhD from the University of Michigan.

== Memberships ==
- American Mathematical Society
- Mathematical Association of America
- Daughters of the American Revolution

== Publications ==
- 1909: "The Development of Algebraic Symbolism from Paciuolo to Newton", School Science and Mathematics. Published version of MA thesis.
- 1929: “The Algebra of Francesco Ghaligai”, American Mathematical Monthly.

== Legacy ==
The Suzan R. Benedict Prize was established after her death by the college president and others at Smith College to be awarded to sophomores who had done exceptional work in differential and integral calculus.
