= Beresford Parlett =

British applied mathematician (1932–2026)

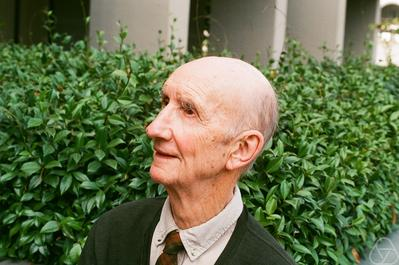
- Parlett at UC Berkeley in 2018
- Born: July 4, 1932; London, England
- Died: February 7, 2026 (aged 93)
- Education: University of Oxford (B.A.); Stanford University (Ph.D.)
- Scientific career
- Fields: Numerical analysis
- Workplaces: University of California, Berkeley
- Thesis: I. Bundles of Matrices and the Linear Independence of Their Minors; II. Applications of Laguerre's Method to the Matrix Eigenvalue Problem (1962)
- Doctoral advisor: George Forsythe
- Doctoral students: Inderjit Dhillon; Anne Greenbaum

Beresford Neill Parlett (July 4, 1932 – February 7, 2026) was an English applied mathematician, who specialised in numerical analysis and scientific computation.

== Life and career ==
Parlett received in 1955 his bachelor's degree in mathematics from the University of Oxford and then worked in his father's timber business for three years. From 1958 to 1962 he was a graduate student in mathematics at Stanford University, where he received his Ph.D. in 1962. He was a postdoc for two years at Manhattan's Courant Institute and one year at the Stevens Institute of Technology. From 1965 until his retirement, he was a faculty member of the mathematics department at the University of California, Berkeley. There he served for some years as chair of the department of computer science, director of the Center for Pure and Applied Mathematics, and professor in the department of electrical engineering and computer science. He was a visiting professor at the University of Toronto, Pierre and Marie Curie University (Paris VI), and the University of Oxford.

He was the author of many influential papers on the numerical solution of eigenvalue problems, the QR algorithm, the Lanczos algorithm, symmetric indefinite systems, and sparse matrix computations.

Parlett died on February 7, 2026, at the age of 93.

== Awards and honours ==
- 2006 — (jointly with Inderjit S. Dhillon) SIAM Activity Group Linear Algebra Best Paper Prize
- 2010 — Hans Schneider Prize in Linear Algebra
- 2011 — Society for Industrial and Applied Mathematics (SIAM) Fellow

== Selected publications ==
=== Articles ===
- Parlett, B. N.; Reinsch, C. (1969). "Balancing a matrix for calculation of eigenvalues and eigenvectors". Numerische Mathematik. 13 (4): 293–304. doi:10.1007/BF02165404. S2CID 122353612.
- Bunch, J. R.; Parlett, B. N. (1971). "Direct Methods for Solving Symmetric Indefinite Systems of Linear Equations". SIAM Journal on Numerical Analysis. 8 (4): 639–655. Bibcode:1971SJNA....8..639B. doi:10.1137/0708060.
- Parlett, B. N. (1974). "The Rayleigh quotient iteration and some generalizations for nonnormal matrices". Mathematics of Computation. 28 (127): 679. doi:10.1090/s0025-5718-1974-0405823-3.
- Parlett, B. N.; Scott, D. S. (1979). "The Lanczos algorithm with selective orthogonalization". Mathematics of Computation. 33 (145): 217–238. doi:10.1090/s0025-5718-1979-0514820-3. hdl:2060/19790002294.
- Kahan, W.; Parlett, B. N.; Jiang, E. (1982). "Residual Bounds on Approximate Eigensystems of Nonnormal Matrices". SIAM Journal on Numerical Analysis. 19 (3): 470–484. Bibcode:1982SJNA...19..470K. doi:10.1137/0719030.
- Parlett, Beresford N.; Taylor, Derek R.; Liu, Zhishun A. (1985). "A look-ahead Lánczos algorithm for unsymmetric matrices". Mathematics of Computation. 44 (169): 105. doi:10.1090/s0025-5718-1985-0771034-2.
- Nour-Omid, Bahram; Parlett, Beresford N.; Ericsson, Thomas; Jensen, Paul S. (1987). "How to implement the spectral transformation". Mathematics of Computation. 48 (178): 663. doi:10.1090/s0025-5718-1987-0878698-5.
- Parlett, Beresford N. (1992). "Some basic information on information-based complexity theory". Bulletin of the American Mathematical Society. 26: 3–29. arXiv:math/9201266. doi:10.1090/S0273-0979-1992-00239-2.
- Fernando, K. Vince; Parlett, Beresford N. (1994). "Accurate singular values and differential qd algorithms". Numerische Mathematik. 67 (2): 191–229. doi:10.1007/s002110050024. S2CID 7635226.
- Paige, Chris C.; Parlett, Beresford N.; Van Der Vorst, Henk A. (1995). "Approximate solutions and eigenvalue bounds from Krylov subspaces". Numerical Linear Algebra with Applications. 2 (2): 115–133. doi:10.1002/nla.1680020205.
- Dhillon, Inderjit S.; Parlett, Beresford N. (2004). "Multiple representations to compute orthogonal eigenvectors of symmetric tridiagonal matrices". Linear Algebra and Its Applications. 387: 1–28. doi:10.1016/j.laa.2003.12.028.
- Bai, Zhong-Zhi; Parlett, Beresford N.; Wang, Zeng-Qi (2005). "On generalized successive overrelaxation methods for augmented linear systems". Numerische Mathematik. 102: 1–38. doi:10.1007/s00211-005-0643-0. S2CID 19189312.
- Shomron, Noam; Parlett, Beresford N. (2009). "Linear Algebra meets Lie Algebra: The Kostant–Wallach theory". Linear Algebra and Its Applications. 431 (10): 1745–1767. arXiv:0809.1204. doi:10.1016/j.laa.2009.06.007. ISSN 0024-3795. S2CID 115167499. arXiv preprint (See Bertram Kostant and Nolan Wallach.)

=== Books ===
- Parlett, Beresford N. (January 1998). The Symmetric Eigenvalue Problem. Philadelphia: SIAM. ISBN 9781611971163; SIAM corrected edition of the original publication by Prentice-Hall in 1980
