= Naomi Jochnowitz =

American mathematician

Naomi G. Jochnowitz is an American mathematician interested in algebraic number theory. She is an associate professor of mathematics at the University of Rochester.

Jochnowitz earned her Ph.D. in 1976 from Harvard University. Her dissertation, Congruences Between Modular Forms and Implications for the Hecke Algebra, was supervised by Barry Mazur. At Rochester, she is known for her enthusiastic encouragement and support for incoming students to participate in the mathematics program, which contributed to a tripled number of mathematics majors from 1999 to 2002.

In 2016, Jochnowitz won the M. Gweneth Humphreys Award of the Association for Women in Mathematics for her mentorship of mathematics students and particularly of women in mathematics. She was also listed as a finalist for the "W" Award of the Rochester Women's Network for her mentorship of women in mathematics. In 2018 she became one of the inaugural Fellows of the Association for Women in Mathematics.
