= Joel Tropp =

American mathematician (born 1977)

Joel A. Tropp
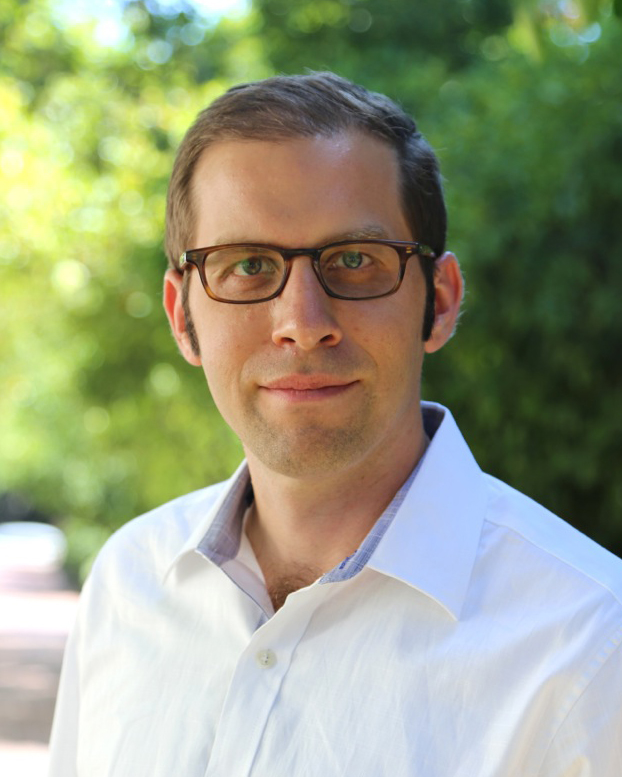
- Born: July 1977 (age 48–49); Austin, Texas
- Education: University of Texas
- Known for: Matching pursuit, Randomized SVD, Matrix Chernoff bound
- Awards: Presidential Early Career Award for Scientists and Engineers (2008) Alfred P. Sloan Research Fellowship (2010); Vasil A. Popov Prize (2010) Monroe H. Martin Prize (2011)
- Scientific career
- Fields: Applied mathematics
- Workplaces: California Institute of Technology; University of Michigan
- Doctoral advisor: Inderjit Dhillon; Anna C. Gilbert

Joel Aaron Tropp (born July 1977 in Austin, Texas) is the Steele Family Professor of Applied and Computational Mathematics in the Computing and Mathematical Sciences Department at the California Institute of Technology. He is known for work on sparse approximation, numerical linear algebra, and random matrix theory.

== Academic biography ==
Tropp studied at the University of Texas, where he completed the BS degree in Mathematics and the BA degree in Plan II Honors in 1999 and the MS and PhD degrees in Computational & Applied Mathematics in 2001 and 2004. His dissertation was titled Topics in Sparse Approximation, and his advisers were Inderjit Dhillon and Anna C. Gilbert. He taught at the University of Michigan from 2004 to 2007. He has been on the faculty of the California Institute of Technology since 2007.

== Research ==
In his early research, Tropp developed performance guarantees for algorithms for sparse approximation and compressed sensing. In 2011, he published a paper on randomized algorithms for computing a truncated singular value decomposition. He has also worked in random matrix theory, where he has established a family of results, collectively called matrix concentration inequalities, that includes the matrix Chernoff bound.

== Awards and honors ==
Tropp was a recipient of the Presidential Early Career Award for Scientists and Engineers (PECASE) in 2008. In 2010, he was awarded an Alfred P. Sloan Research Fellowship in Mathematics, and he received the Sixth Vasil A. Popov Prize in approximation theory for his work on Matching Pursuit algorithms. He won the Eighth Monroe H. Martin Prize in applied mathematics in 2011 for work on sparse optimization. He was recognized as a Thomson Reuters Highly Cited Researcher in Computer Science for the years 2014, 2015, and 2016. In 2019 he was named a SIAM Fellow "for contributions to signal processing, data analysis, and randomized linear algebra". He was elected to the 2026 class of Fellows of the American Mathematical Society.
