= Susan Miller Rambo =

American mathematician

- Born: April 3, 1883; Easton, Pennsylvania
- Died: January 7, 1977 (aged 93); Northampton, Massachusetts
- Education: Smith College; University of Michigan
- Scientific career
- Fields: Mathematics
- Workplaces: Smith College
- Doctoral advisor: Walter Burton Ford

Susan Miller Rambo (April 3, 1883 – January 7, 1977) was the second woman awarded a Ph.D. from the University of Michigan and had a long teaching career at Smith College.

== Biography ==
Born in Easton, Pennsylvania, Susan Rambo was the eldest child of George and Annie Rambo. Her father was a wholesale grocer. She graduated high school in Easton, then entered Smith College, located in Northampton, Massachusetts. After graduating from Smith, she taught high school mathematics in Hoosick Falls, New York until 1908.

Susan Rambo joined the mathematics department at her alma mater in 1908 as an assistant in mathematics and remained there the remainder of her career with promotions to instructor in 1911, assistant professor in 1918, associate professor in 1922 and professor in 1937. She was department chairman from 1934 to 1940 and retired in 1948 as professor emeritus. One of her students was Mabel Gweneth Humphreys.

Susan Rambo never married. From 1918 she shared a house with her colleague Suzan Rose Benedict until the latter’s death in 1942. In 1945, Susan relinquished her life tenure on the house and the proceeds from its sale went to Smith College to be used for scholarships. She died in a Northampton nursing home in 1977.

== Graduate education ==
Starting early in her career at Smith, Susan Rambo began taking graduate courses and was awarded her master's degree in 1913. Her thesis was “A comparative study of analytic and synthetic projective geometry”. In 1916 she took a leave of absence from Smith and studied for her PhD the next two years at the University of Michigan. Her dissertation, “The point at infinity as a regular point of certain linear difference equations of the second order” was directed by Walter Burton Ford. In 1920 she received her PhD, two years after returning to Smith.

== Memberships ==
American Mathematical Society. In 1928 Susan Rambo was a delegate from the society to the International Congress of Mathematicians in Bologna, Italy.

Mathematical Association of America

== Publications ==
- 1905 A Defense of Immigration.
- 1946 Review of College Mathematics: A General Introduction, by C. H.Sisam. Science n.s., 104:169.
