= When Topology Meets Chemistry =

2000 book in chemical graph theory

When Topology Meets Chemistry: A Topological Look at Molecular Chirality
- Author: Erica Flapan
- Series: Outlooks
- Subject: Chemical graph theory and chirality
- Publisher: Cambridge University Press; Mathematical Association of America
- Publication date: 2000

When Topology Meets Chemistry: A Topological Look At Molecular Chirality is a book in chemical graph theory on the graph-theoretic analysis of chirality in molecular structures. It was written by Erica Flapan, based on a series of lectures she gave in 1996 at the Institut Henri Poincaré, and was published in 2000 by the Cambridge University Press and Mathematical Association of America as the first volume in their shared Outlooks book series.

== Topics ==
A chiral molecule is a molecular structure that is different from its mirror image. This property, while seemingly abstract, can have big consequences in biochemistry, where the shape of molecules is essential to their chemical function, and where a chiral molecule can have very different biological activities from its mirror-image molecule. When Topology Meets Chemistry concerns the mathematical analysis of molecular chirality.

The book has seven chapters, beginning with an introductory overview and ending with a chapter on the chirality of DNA molecules. Other topics covered through the book include the rigid geometric chirality of tree-like molecular structures such as tartaric acid, and the stronger topological chirality of molecules that cannot be deformed into their mirror image without breaking and re-forming some of their molecular bonds. It discusses results of Flapan and Jonathan Simon on molecules with the molecular structure of Möbius ladders, according to which every embedding of a Möbius ladder with an odd number of rungs is chiral while Möbius ladders with an even number of rungs have achiral embeddings. It uses the symmetries of graphs, in a result that the symmetries of certain graphs can always be extended to topological symmetries of three-dimensional space, from which it follows that non-planar graphs with no self-inverse symmetry are always chiral. It discusses graphs for which every embedding is topologically knotted or linked. And it includes material on the use of knot invariants to detect topological chirality.

== Audience and reception ==
The book is self-contained, and requires only an undergraduate level of mathematics. It includes many exercises, making it suitable for use as a textbook at both the advanced undergraduate and introductory graduate levels. Reviewer Buks van Rensburg describes the book's presentation as "efficient and intuitive", and recommends the book to "every mathematician or chemist interested in the notions of chirality and symmetry".
