= Donald G. Saari =

American mathematician (born 1940)

- Born: March 1940 (age 86); Houghton, Michigan, U.S.
- Education: Michigan Technological University; Purdue University
- Awards: Chauvenet Prize (1995); National Academy of Sciences (2001)
- Scientific career
- Fields: Celestial mechanics; Social choice theory; Mathematical economics
- Workplaces: Yale University; Northwestern University; University of California, Irvine
- Thesis: Singularities of the n-Body Problem of Celestial Mechanics (1967)
- Doctoral advisor: Harry Pollard
- Doctoral students: Deanna Haunsperger; Zhihong Xia

Donald Gene Saari (born March 1940) is an American mathematician, a Distinguished Professor of Mathematics and Economics and former director of the Institute for Mathematical Behavioral Sciences at the University of California, Irvine. His research interests include the n-body problem, the Borda count voting system, and application of mathematics to the social sciences.

== Contributions ==
Saari has been widely quoted as an expert in voting systems and lottery odds. He is opposed to the use of the Condorcet criterion in evaluating voting systems, and among positional voting schemes he favors using the Borda count over plurality voting, because it reduces the frequency of paradoxical outcomes (which however cannot be avoided entirely in ranking systems because of Arrow's impossibility theorem). For instance, as he has pointed out, plurality voting can lead to situations where the election outcome would remain unchanged if all voters' preferences were reversed; this cannot happen with the Borda count. Saari has defined, as a measure of the inconsistency of a voting method, the number of different combinations of outcomes that would be possible for all subsets of a field of candidates. According to this measure, the Borda count is the least inconsistent possible positional voting scheme, while plurality voting is the most inconsistent. However, other voting theorists such as Steven Brams, while agreeing with Saari that plurality voting is a bad system, disagree with his advocacy of the Borda count, because it is too easily manipulated by tactical voting. Saari also applies similar methods to a different problem in political science, the apportionment of seats to electoral districts in proportion to their populations. He has written several books on the mathematics of voting.^{[S94]}^{[S95a]}^{[S01a]}^{[S01b]}^{[S08]}

In economics, Saari has shown that natural price mechanisms that set the rate of change of the price of a commodity proportional to its excess demand can lead to chaotic behavior rather than converging to an economic equilibrium, and has exhibited alternative price mechanisms that can be guaranteed to converge. However, as he also showed, such mechanisms require that the change in price be determined as a function of the whole system of prices and demands, rather than being reducible to a computation over pairs of commodities.^{[SS]}^{[S85]}^{[S95b]}

In celestial mechanics, Saari's work on the n-body problem "revived the singularity theory" of Henri Poincaré and Paul Painlevé, and proved Littlewood's conjecture that the initial conditions leading to collisions have measure zero. He also formulated the "Saari conjecture", that when a solution to the Newtonian n-body problem has an unchanging moment of inertia relative to its center of mass, its bodies must be in relative equilibrium. More controversially, Saari has taken the position that anomalies in the rotation speeds of galaxies, discovered by Vera Rubin, can be explained by considering more carefully the pairwise gravitational interactions of individual stars instead of approximating the gravitational effects of a galaxy on a star by treating the rest of the galaxy as a continuous mass distribution (or, as Saari calls it, "star soup"). In support of this hypothesis, Saari showed that simplified mathematical models of galaxies as systems of large numbers of bodies arranged symmetrically on circular shells could be made to form central configurations that rotate as a rigid body rather than with the outer bodies rotating at the speed predicted by the total mass interior to them. According to his theories, neither dark matter nor modifications to the laws of gravitational force are needed to explain galactic rotation speeds. However, his results do not rule out the existence of dark matter, as they do not address other evidence for dark matter based on gravitational lenses and irregularities in the cosmic microwave background. His works in this area include two more books.^{[SX]}^{[S05]}

Overviewing his work in these diverse areas, Saari has argued that his contributions to them are strongly related. In his view, Arrow's impossibility theorem in voting theory, the failure of simple pricing mechanisms, and the failure of previous analysis to explain the speeds of galactic rotation stem from the same cause: a reductionist approach that divides a complex problem (a multi-candidate election, a market, or a rotating galaxy) into multiple simpler subproblems (two-candidate elections for the Condorcet criterion, two-commodity markets, or the interactions between individual stars and the aggregate mass of the rest of the galaxy) but, in the process, loses information about the initial problem making it impossible to combine the subproblem solutions into an accurate solution to the whole problem.^{[S15]} Saari credits some of his research success to a strategy of mulling over research problems on long road trips, without access to pencil or paper.

Saari is also known for having some discussion with Theodore J. Kaczynski in 1978, prior to the mail bombings that led to Kaczynski's 1996 arrest.

== Education and career ==
Saari grew up in a Finnish American copper mining community in the Upper Peninsula of Michigan, the son of two labor organizers there. Frequently in trouble for talking in his classes, he spent his detention time in private mathematics lessons with a local algebra teacher, Bill Brotherton. He was accepted to an Ivy League university, but his family could only afford to send him to the local state university, Michigan Technological University, which gave him a full scholarship. He majored in mathematics there, his third choice after previously trying chemistry and electrical engineering. While attending Michigan Tech, Saari joined the Beta chapter of Theta Tau Professional Engineering Fraternity.

He received his Bachelor of Science in mathematics in 1962 from Michigan Tech, and his Master of Science and PhD in mathematics from Purdue University in 1964 and 1967, respectively. At Purdue, he began working with his doctoral advisor, Harry Pollard, because of a shared interest in pedagogy, but soon picked up Pollard's interests in celestial mechanics and wrote his doctoral dissertation on the n-body problem.

After taking a temporary position at Yale University, he was hired at Northwestern University by Ralph P. Boas Jr., who had also been doing similar work in celestial mechanics. From 1968 to 2000, he served as assistant, associate, and full professor of mathematics at Northwestern, and eventually became Pancoe Professor of Mathematics there. He was led to mathematical economics by discovering the high caliber of the economics students enrolling in his courses in functional analysis, and added a second position as Professor of Economics. He then moved to the University of California, Irvine at the invitation of R. Duncan Luce, who had founded the Institute for Mathematical Behavioral Sciences (IMBS) in the UCI School of Social Sciences in 1989. At UC Irvine, he took over the directorship of the IMBS in 2003, and stepped down as director in 2017. He is a trustee of the Mathematical Sciences Research Institute.

He was editor in chief of the Bulletin of the American Mathematical Society from 1998 to 2005, and published a book on the early history of the journal.^{[S03]}

== Awards and honors ==
- In 1985, with John B. Urenko, Saari received a Lester Randolph Ford Award for a paper they wrote demonstrating that Newton's method for the approximation of the root of a polynomial can exhibit chaotic behavior when its initial conditions are poorly chosen.^{[SU]}
- He has honorary doctorates from Purdue University (1989), the University of Caen Normandy (1998), Michigan Technological University (1999), and the University of Turku (2009).
- He received in 1995 the Chauvenet Prize for another of his papers, relating the history of the n-body problem and showing how to use spinors to eliminate some of the singularities arising in this problem.^{[S90]}
- In 1999, he and Fabrice Valognes won the Allendoerfer Award for their work on the geometry of voting schemes.^{[SV]}
- In 1999, a conference on celestial mechanics was held at Northwestern in honor of his 60th birthday.
- In 2001 he was elected to the United States National Academy of Sciences, and in 2004 he was named a Fellow of the American Academy of Arts and Sciences.
- He gave the Pacific Institute for the Mathematical Sciences Distinguished Chair Lecture at the University of Victoria in 2002, speaking on the title "Mathematical Social Sciences, an oxymoron?".
- He was elected as an external member of the Finnish Academy of Science and Letters in 2009, and in the same year he became a fellow of the Society for Industrial and Applied Mathematics "for contributions to dynamics, voting, and economics".
- In 2012 he became one of the inaugural fellows of the American Mathematical Society.
- In 2018 he was elected as a foreign member of the Russian Academy of Sciences.
- Asteroid 9177 Donsaari, discovered by Eleanor Helin at Palomar Observatory in 1990, was named in his honor. The official naming citation was published by the Minor Planet Center on 5 February 2020 (M.P.C. 121135).

== Selected publications ==
=== Books ===
S94.
Geometry of Voting, Studies in Economic Theory 3, Springer-Verlag, 1994.
- Review of Geometry of Voting by Vincent Merlin (1995), Social Choice and Welfare 12 (1): 103–110, JSTOR 41106115.
- Review of Geometry of Voting by Maurice Salles (1996), MR 1297124.

S95a.
Basic Geometry of Voting, Springer-Verlag, 1995.
- Review of Basic Geometry of Voting by Maurice Salles (1998), MR 1410265.

S01a.
Chaotic Elections! A Mathematician Looks at Voting, American Mathematical Society, 2001.
- Review of Chaotic Elections! by Edward W. Packe (2001), MAA Reviews, MAA.
- Review of Chaotic Elections! by Maurice Salles (2002), MR 1822218.
- Review of Chaotic Elections! by Sarah Reardon (2008), Math Horizons 16 (1): 22, JSTOR 25678770 25678770.

S01b.
Decisions and Elections; Explaining the Unexpected, Cambridge University Press, 2001.
- Review of Decisions and Elections by Richard J. Cleary (2002), Journal of the American Statistical Association 97 (460): 1216, JSTOR 3085863 3085863.
- Review of Decisions and Elections by John A. Weymark (2003), Journal of Economic Literature 41 (2): 587–589, JSTOR 3216979 3216979.
- Review of Decisions and Elections by David Pritchard (2010), ACM SIGACT News 41 (3): 30–33, doi:10.1145/1855118.1855124.

S05.
Collisions, Rings, and Other Newtonian N-Body Problems, American Mathematical Society, 2005.
- Review of Collisions, Rings, and Other Newtonian N-Body Problems by Fernando Q. Gouvêa (2005), MAA Reviews, MAA.
- Review of "Collisions, Rings, and Other Newtonian N-Body Problems" by Alain Albouy (2006), MR 2139425.

S08.
Disposing Dictators, Demystifying Voting Paradoxes: Social Choice Analysis, Cambridge University Press, 2008.
- Review of Disposing Dictators by Christian Klamler (2009), MR 2449532.
- Review of Disposing Dictators by Feng Zhang (2009), Social Choice and Welfare 32 (4): 697–700, JSTOR 41107989, doi:10.1007/s00355-009-0365-9
- Review of Disposing Dictators by Michael C. Munger (2009), Public Choice 140 (3/4): 539–542, JSTOR 40270936, doi:10.1007/s11127-009-9435-x
- Review of Disposing Dictators by Shmuel Nitzan (2010), Economica 78 (309): 191–192 doi:10.1111/j.1468-0335.2010.00832.x

=== Edited volumes ===
SX.	Hamiltonian Dynamics and Celestial Mechanics (with Z. Xia), Contemporary Mathematics 198, American Mathematical Society, 1996.

S03.
The Way it Was: Mathematics From the Early Years of the Bulletin, American Mathematical Society, 2003.
- Review of The Way it Was by Kenneth A. Ross (2004), MAA Reviews, MAA.

=== Papers ===
SS.
Saari, Donald G.; Simon, Carl P. (1978), "Effective price mechanisms" (PDF), Econometrica, 46 (5): 1097–1125, doi:10.2307/1911438, JSTOR 1911438.
- Review of "Effective price mechanisms" by J. A. Rickard (1980), MR 0508687.

SU.
Saari, Donald G.; Urenko, John B. (1984), "Newton's method, circle maps, and chaotic motion", American Mathematical Monthly, 91 (1): 3–17, doi:10.2307/2322163, JSTOR 2322163
- Lester R. Ford Award citation, MAA, 1985.
- Review of "Newton's method, circle maps, and chaotic motion" by Dietrich Flockerzi (1985), MR 0729188.

S85.
Saari, Donald G. (1985), "Iterative price mechanisms", Econometrica, 53 (5): 1117–1131, doi:10.2307/1911014, JSTOR 1911014.
- Review of "Iterative price mechanisms" by Takayuki Nôno (1987), MR 0809906.

S90.
Saari, Donald G. (1990), "A Visit to the Newtonian N-body problem via elementary complex variables", American Mathematical Monthly, 97 (2): 105–119, doi:10.2307/2323910, JSTOR 2323910
- Review of "A visit to the Newtonian N-body problem" by George Bozis (1991), MR 1041887.
- Chauvenet Prize citation, MAA, 1995.

S95b.
Saari, Donald (1995), "Mathematical complexity of simple economics", Notices of the American Mathematical Society, 42 (2): 222–230.
- Review of "Mathematical complexity of simple economics" by Dave Furth (1995), MR 1311641.

SV.
Saari, Donald G.; Valognes, Fabrice (1998), "Geometry, voting, and paradoxes", Mathematics Magazine, 71 (4): 243–259, doi:10.2307/2690696, JSTOR 2690696
- Review of "Geometry, voting, and paradoxes" by Fouad T. Aleskerov (2000), MR 1708058.
- Carl B. Allendoerfer Award citation, MAA, 1999.

S15.	Saari, Donald G. (2015), "From Arrow's Theorem to 'Dark Matter'", British Journal of Political Science, 46 (1): 1–9, doi:10.1017/s000712341500023x, S2CID 154799988
