= Mechanical singularity =

In engineering, a mechanical singularity is a position or configuration of a mechanism or a machine where the subsequent behaviour cannot be predicted, or the forces or other physical quantities involved become infinite or nondeterministic.

When the underlying engineering equations of a mechanism or machine are evaluated at the singular configuration (if any exists), then those equations exhibit mathematical singularity.

Examples of mechanical singularities are gimbal lock and in static mechanical analysis, an under-constrained system.

== Types of singularities ==
There are three types of singularities that can be found in mechanisms: direct-kinematics singularities, inverse-kinematics singularities, and combined singularities. These singularities occur when one or both Jacobian matrices of the mechanisms becomes singular of rank-deficient. The relationship between the input and output velocities of the mechanism are defined by the following general equation:

$\textbf{A}\dot{\textbf{x}}+\textbf{B}\dot{\textbf{q}}=\textbf{0}$

where $\dot{\textbf{x}}$ is the output velocities, $\dot{\textbf{q}}$ is the input velocities, $\textbf{A}$ is the direct-kinematics Jacobians, and $\textbf{B}$ is the inverse-kinematics Jacobian.

=== Type-I: Inverse-kinematics singularities ===
This first kind of singularities occurs when:

$\det(\textbf{B})=0$

=== Type-II: Direct-kinematics singularities ===
This second kind of singularities occurs when:

$\det(\textbf{A})=0$

=== Type-III: Combined singularities ===
This kind of singularities occurs when for a particular configuration, both $\textbf {A}$ and $\textbf {B}$ become singular simultaneously.
