= Dan Kalman =

American mathematician

Daniel "Dan" Simon Kalman (born March 21, 1952, in Oakland, California) is an American mathematician and winner of nine awards for expository writing in mathematics.

== Education and career ==
After graduating from Oakland High School in 1970, Kalman matriculated at Harvey Mudd College, where he graduated in 1974. From 1974 to 1980 he was a graduate student at the University of Wisconsin–Madison, where he received his PhD in 1980. He was from 1978 to 1979 an instructor at Lawrence University in Appleton, Wisconsin, and from 1979 to 1983 an assistant professor at the University of Wisconsin–Green Bay. After teaching as a visiting lecturer from 1983 to 1985 at Augustana College in Sioux Falls, South Dakota, Kalman worked from 1985 to 1993 as a member of the technical staff of The Aerospace Corporation in Los Angeles. At Washington, D.C.'s American University he was from 1993 to 1998 an assistant professor, from 1998 to 2003 an associate professor, and from 2003 to 2018 a full professor, retiring in 2018 as professor emeritus. From 1996 to 1997 he was Associate Executive Director of the Mathematical Association of America (MAA) in Washington, D.C.

The MAA has given Kalman nine awards for outstanding expository articles or books. He won the George Pólya Award in 1994 and in 2003, the Trevor Evans Award in 1997 and (with coauthor Nathan Carter) in 2012, the Carl B. Allendoerfer Award (with coauthors Robert Mena and Shariar Shariari) in 1998 and (alone) in 2003, the Lester R. Ford Award in 2009 and (with coauthor Mark McKinzie) in 2013, and the Beckenbach Book Prize in 2012.

== Selected publications ==
=== Articles ===
- Kalman, Dan (January 1984). "The generalized Vandermonde matrix". Mathematics Magazine. 57 (1): 15–21. doi:10.1080/0025570X.1984.11977069.
- Kalman, Dan (November 1993). "Six Ways to Sum a Series" (PDF). The College Mathematics Journal. 24 (5): 402–421. doi:10.1080/07468342.1993.11973562. (1994 George Polya Award, independently awarded to Charles Groetsch in the same year)
- "The SVD: A Singularly Valuable Decomposition" (PDF). The College Mathematics Journal. 27 (1): 2–23. January 1996. doi:10.1080/07468342.1996.11973744. (over 450 citations)
- with Robert Mena and Shahriar Shahriari: Kalman, Dan; Mena, Robert; Shahriari, Shahriar (April 1997). "Variations on an Irrational Theme—Geometry, Dynamics, Algebra" (PDF). Mathematics Magazine. 70 (2): 93–104. doi:10.1080/0025570X.1997.11996511.
- with James White: Kalman, Dan; White, James (November 1998). "A Simple Solution of the Cubic" (PDF). The College Mathematics Journal. 29 (5): 415–418. doi:10.1080/07468342.1998.11973980.
- Kalman, Dan (April 1999). "Marriages Made in the Heavens: A Practical Application of Existence" (PDF). Mathematics Magazine. 72 (2): 94–103. doi:10.1080/0025570X.1999.11996711.
- Kalman, Dan (October 2000). "A Matrix Proof of Newton's Identities" (PDF). Mathematics Magazine. 73 (4): 313–315. doi:10.2307/2690982. JSTOR 2690982.
- "A Generalization Logarithm for Exponential-Linear Equations" (PDF). The College Mathematics Journal. 32 (1): 2–13. January 2001. doi:10.1080/07468342.2001.11921844. S2CID 35745404.
- with Jane Day: Day, Jane M.; Kalman, Dan (May 2001). "Teaching Linear Algebra: Issues and Resources" (PDF). The College Mathematics Journal. 32 (3): 162–168. doi:10.1080/07468342.2001.11921870. S2CID 124008929.
- "Integrability and the glog Function" (PDF). AMATYC Review. 23 (1): 43–50. Fall 2001.
- with James White: Kalman, Dan; White, James E. (November 2001). "Polynomial Equations and Circulant Matrices" (PDF). American Mathematical Monthly. 108 (9): 821–841. doi:10.2307/2695555. JSTOR 2695555.
- Kalman, Dan (June 2002). "Doubly Recursive Multivariate Automatic Differentiation" (PDF). Mathematics Magazine. 75 (3): 187–203. doi:10.1080/0025570X.2002.11953128. S2CID 55200269.
- Kalman, Dan (November 2002). "An Undetermined Linear System for GPS" (PDF). The College Mathematics Journal. 33 (5): 384–390. doi:10.1080/07468342.2002.11921968. S2CID 36046349. (2003 George Pólya Award)
- with Robert Mena: Kalman, Dan; Mena, Robert (June 2003). "The Fibonacci numbers—exposed" (PDF). Mathematics Magazine. 76 (3): 167–181. doi:10.1080/0025570X.2003.11953176. S2CID 122720917. (over 230 citations)
  - "The Fibonacci numbers—exposed (slides from a talk)" (PDF). Fall 2002.
- Kalman, Dan (November 2005). "Virtual Empirical Investigation: Concept Formation and Theory Justification" (PDF). American Mathematical Monthly. 112 (9): 786–798. doi:10.1080/00029890.2005.11920252. S2CID 14074730.
- Kalman, Dan (September 2006). "The Maximal Deflection on an Ellipse" (PDF). The College Mathematics Journal. 37 (4): 250–260. doi:10.1080/07468342.2006.11922192. S2CID 119605031.
- Kalman, Dan (June 2007). "Solving the Ladder Problem on the Back of an Envelope" (PDF). Mathematics Magazine. 80 (3): 163–182. doi:10.1080/0025570X.2007.11953477. S2CID 126061214.
- Kalman, Dan (November 2007). "Archimedes in the 5th Dimension" (PDF). Math Horizons. 15 (2): 8–10. doi:10.1080/10724117.2007.11974736. S2CID 126002045.
- Kalman, Dan (April 2008). "An Elementary Proof of Marden's Theorem" (PDF). American Mathematical Monthly. 115 (4): 330–338. doi:10.1080/00029890.2008.11920532. S2CID 13222698. (2009 Lester R. Ford Award)
- Kalman, Dan (April 2008). "The Most Marvelous Theorem in Mathematics" (PDF). Math Horizons. 15 (4): 16–17. doi:10.1080/10724117.2008.11974767. S2CID 125370142.
  - "The Most Marvelous Theorem in Mathematics" (PDF). Journal of Online Mathematics and Its Applications. April 2008. (slides from a talk)
- Kalman, Dan (June 2009). "Leveling with Lagrange: An Alternate View of Constrained Optimization" (PDF). Mathematics Magazine. 82 (3): 186–196. doi:10.1080/0025570X.2009.11953617. S2CID 121070192.
- with Mark McKinzie: Dan Kalman; Mark Mckinzie (January 2012). "Another Way to Sum a Series: Generating Functions, Euler, and the Dilog Function" (PDF). American Mathematical Monthly. 119 (1): 42–51. doi:10.4169/amer.math.monthly.119.01.042. S2CID 18499102.

=== Books ===
- Elementary Mathematical Models: Order Aplenty and a Glimpse of Chaos. Mathematical Association of America. 1997. ISBN 0-88385-707-3.
  - with Sacha Forgoston and Albert Goetz: Kalman, Dan; Forgoston, Sacha; Goetz, Albert (2019). Elementary Mathematical Models: An Accessible Development without Calculus. AMS/MAA Textbooks (2nd ed.). ISBN 978-1-4704-5001-4.
- Uncommon Mathematical Excursions: Polynomia and Related Realms. Dolciani Mathematical Expositions. Vol. 35. Mathematical Association of America. 2008. (2012 Beckenbach Book Prize)
  - Uncommon Mathematical Excursions: Polynomia and Related Realms. MAA. April 2, 2009. ISBN 978-0-88385-341-2; pbk
