= Ruma Falk =

Israeli psychologist and philosopher of mathematics (1932–2020)

- רומה פלק
- Born: Oren-Aharonovich; 1932; Jerusalem, Mandatory Palestine
- Died: August 15, 2020 (aged 87–88)
- Education: Hebrew University of Jerusalem
- Known for: Probability theory, human understanding of probability and statistics
- Awards: George Pólya Award (1984)
- Scientific career
- Fields: Psychology, Philosophy of Mathematics
- Workplaces: Hebrew University of Jerusalem
- Doctoral advisor: Amos Tversky

Ruma Falk (Hebrew: רומה פלק, née Oren-Aharonovich, 1932–2020) was an Israeli psychologist and philosopher of mathematics known for her work on probability theory and human understanding of probability and statistics.

== Biography ==
Falk was born in Jerusalem, and educated at the Herzliya Hebrew Gymnasium and Hebrew University of Jerusalem. She completed her PhD on the perception of chance at the Hebrew University in 1975 under the supervision of Amos Tversky, and became a professor there. She was married to Raphael Falk, a geneticist and historian of science.

Falk won the George Pólya Award of the Mathematical Association of America with Maya Bar-Hillel in 1984 for their joint work on probability.

She died on August 15, 2020.

== Selected works ==
Falk was the author of books including:

- Understanding Probability and Statistics: A Book of Problems (A K Peters, 1993)
- אתגרים לתאים האפורים (Challenges to the Gray Cells, Poalim Library Publishing, 2004)
- יש בעיה! (There is a Problem, Poalim Library Publishing, 2013)
- Many Faces of the Gambler's Fallacy: Subjective Randomness and Its Diverse Manifestations (self-published, 2016)

She also created a board game, ברירה וסיכוי (Choice and Chance).

Her other publications include:

- Bar-Hillel, Maya; Falk, Ruma (March 1982), "Some teasers concerning conditional probabilities", Cognition, 11 (2): 109–122, doi:10.1016/0010-0277(82)90021-x, PMID 7198956, S2CID 44509163
- Falk, Ruma; Bar-Hillel, Maya (June 1983), "Probabilistic dependence between events", The Two-Year College Mathematics Journal, 14 (3): 240–247, doi:10.2307/3027094, JSTOR 3027094
- Falk, Ruma; Greenbaum, Charles W. (February 1995), "Significance tests die hard", Theory & Psychology, 5 (1): 75–98, doi:10.1177/0959354395051004, S2CID 143583538
- Falk, Ruma; Konold, Clifford (1997), "Making sense of randomness: Implicit encoding as a basis for judgment.", Psychological Review, 104 (2): 301–318, doi:10.1037/0033-295x.104.2.301
