= Ezra Brown =

American mathematician

Ezra Abraham "Bud" Brown (born January 22, 1944, in Reading, Pennsylvania) is an American mathematician active in combinatorics, algebraic number theory, elliptic curves, graph theory, expository mathematics and cryptography. He spent most of his career at Virginia Tech where he is now Alumni Distinguished Professor Emeritus of Mathematics.

== Education and career ==
Brown earned a BA at Rice University in 1965. He then studied mathematics at Louisiana State University (LSU), getting an MS in 1967 and a PhD in 1969 with the dissertation "Representations of Discriminantal Divisors by Binary Quadratic Forms" under Gordon Pall. He joined Virginia Tech in 1969 becoming Assistant Professor (1969–73), Associate Professor (1973–81), Professor (1981–2005), and Alumni Distinguished Professor of Mathematics and Distinguished Professor of Mathematics (2005–2017). He retired from Virginia Tech in 2017.

Brown became interested in elliptic curves while at LSU and this has remained one of his principal areas of research along with quadratic forms and algebraic number theory in general.

His extensive expository writing has garnered him many awards from the MAA, including the Chauvenet Prize, the Allendoerfer Award (3 times) and the Pólya Award (3 times).

His books include The Unity of Combinatorics (MAA, 2020), co-authored with Richard K. Guy.

== Personal life ==
While at LSU he met his future wife Jo. Brown remained at Virginia Tech until his retirement in 2017.

At the age of 16 Brown taught himself to play the piano, and in college he acted in several musicals and joined an a cappella chorus. In 1989, he joined the Blacksburg Master Chorale and the chorus of Opera Roanoke. Starting in 2011 he took his love of music and math to MathFest where he and his fellow mathematicians composed new words to old show tunes and even took part in a Gilbert-and-Sullivan Singalong at MathFest 2016 with his "Biscuits of Number Theory" co-editor Art Benjamin.

Brown and his mathematical grandfather, L. E. Dickson, have the same birthday.

== Selected publications ==
papers

- 2018 "Five Families Around a Well: A New Look at an Old Problem" (with Matthew Crawford)
- 2015 "Many More Names of (7,3,1)]"
- 2012 "Why Ellipses Are Not Elliptic Curves" (with Adrian Rice)
- 2009 "Kirkman's Schoolgirls Wearing Hats and Walking Through Fields of Numbers" (with Keith Mellinger)
- 2005 "Phoebe Floats!"Phoebe Floats!
- 2004 "The Fabulous (11, 5, 2) Biplane"
- 2002 "The Many Names of (7,3,1)"
- 2000 "Three Fermat Trails to Elliptic Curves"
- 1999 "Square Roots from 1; 24, 51, 10 to Dan Shanks"

books

- 2020 (with Richard K. Guy) The Unity of Combinatorics, American Mathematical Society, ISBN 1-4704-5279-0
- 2009 (co-edited with Arthur T. Benjamin) Biscuits of Number Theory, MAA Publications, ISBN 978-0-88385-340-5
- 1990 (translation from German) Regiomontanus: His Life and Work

== Awards ==
- 2022 MAA Chauvenet Prize (with Matthew Crawford) for "Five Families Around a Well: A New Look at an Old Problem"
- 2014 MAA Sister Helen Christensen Service Award
- 2013 MAA Allendoerfer Award (with Adrian Rice) for "Why Ellipses Are Not Elliptic Curves"
- 2010 MAA Allendoerfer Award (with Keith Mellinger) for "Kirkman's Schoolgirls Wearing Hats and Walking Through Fields of Numbers"
- 2003 MAA Allendoerfer Award for "The Many Names of (7,3,1)"
- 2001 MAA Pólya Award for "Three Fermat Trails to Elliptic Curves"
- 2000 MAA Pólya Award for "Square Roots from 1; 24, 51, 10 to Dan Shanks"
- 2006 MAA Pólya Award for "Phoebe Floats!"
- 1999 MAA John M. Smith Award for Distinguished College or University Teaching
- 1997 Virginia Tech Edward S. Diggs Teaching Scholar Award
- Omicron Delta Kappa G. Burke Johnston Award
