= Grabiner =

Grabiner is a surname. Notable people with the surname include:

- Anthony Grabiner, Baron Grabiner (born 1945), British barrister, academic administrator, and life peer
- Harry Grabiner (1890–1948), American baseball executive
- Judith Grabiner (born 1938), American mathematician and historian
