= Israel Kleiner =

Israel Kleiner may refer to:

- Israel Kleiner (biochemist) (1885–1966), biochemist
- Israel Kleiner (mathematician), Canadian mathematician, professor at York University
