= Frieda Zames =

American mathematician and disability rights activist

Frieda Zames (October 29, 1932 – June 16, 2005) was an American disability rights activist and mathematics professor. With her sister, Doris Zames Fleischer, Zames wrote The Disability Rights Movement: From Charity to Confrontation, a historical survey that has been used as a disability rights textbook.

== Life and career ==
Zames was born on October 29, 1932, in Brooklyn and died on June 16, 2005, in Manhattan. Disabled by a childhood bout of polio, Zames was institutionalized for many years. Because of institutionalization and the school system's automatic placement of physically disabled students in non-rigorous academic tracks, Zames was mostly self-taught, according to friends.

Zames earned an undergraduate degree from Brooklyn College where she was Phi Beta Kappa. Zames' mother accompanied her to college every day and carried her books. Zames, then her family's breadwinner, worked as an actuary at MetLife, then went on to earn a doctorate in mathematics from New York University. In 1966 Zames was hired by the New Jersey Institute of Technology (NJIT) in Newark, where she taught classes ranging from remedial to graduate level. She retired with the title associate professor of Mathematics Emeritus in 2000.

Zames' activism began in the 1970s, when she joined the disability rights group Disabled in Action and began to use a motorized scooter, which enabled her to travel to protests more easily. In one of her first demonstrations, she joined a group of paraplegic activists in surrounding a Metropolitan Transportation Authority bus during rush hour to protest its lack of wheelchair access, part of a campaign which ultimately resulted in all MTA buses being fitted in wheelchair lifts beginning in 1981. Once the Americans with Disabilities Act took effect, Zames joined in a successful lawsuit to make the Empire State Building accessible. She also participated in campaigns to make the school at which she taught, NJIT, wheelchair accessible. Other work focused on curb cuts, restaurants, subways, ferries, public restrooms and public buildings. Zames' activism included civil disobedience, litigation and advocacy literature to obtain full participation in public life for disabled people.

According to her sister, Doris Zames Fleischer, Zames' sense of social justice included the struggles for equality for women, racial minorities, gays and other disfranchised people. Zames served on the board of Disabled in Action, the New York State Independent Living Coalition, the Disabilities Network of NYC, and WBAI, a radio station.

== Awards and honors ==
Zames won the George Pólya Award of the Mathematical Association of America in 1978, for her work describing the Schwarz lantern, a shape demonstrating that the area of smooth surfaces cannot be accurately approximated by polyhedra that are close to the surface. The corner of First Avenue and East 4th Street in Manhattan was named Frieda Zames Way in 2009 in her honor.
