= Ayşe Şahin =

Turkish-American mathematician

Ayşe Arzu Şahin is a Turkish-American mathematician who works in dynamical systems. She was appointed the Dean of the College of Science and Mathematics at Wright State University in June 2020, and is a co-author of two textbooks on calculus and dynamical systems.

== Education and career ==
Şahin graduated from Mount Holyoke College in 1988. She completed her Ph.D. in 1994 at the University of Maryland, College Park. Her dissertation, Tiling Representations of $\mathbb{R}^2$ Actions and $\alpha$-Equivalence in Two Dimensions, was supervised by Daniel Rudolph.

She joined the mathematics faculty at North Dakota State University, where she worked from 1994 until 2001, when she moved to DePaul University. At DePaul, she became a full professor in 2010, and co-directed a master's program in Middle School Mathematics. She moved again to Wright State as Chair of the Department of Mathematics and Statistics in 2015. In addition to serving as Dean, Şahin focuses her research on ergodic theory and symbolic dynamics, areas within dynamical systems that examine the long-term behavior of systems through a mathematical lens. She is also involved in initiatives that support student success in STEM fields and serves as an advocate for increased access to mathematics education for underrepresented groups.

== Books ==
In 2017, with Kathleen Madden and Aimee Johnson, Şahin published the textbook Discovering Discrete Dynamical Systems through the Mathematical Association of America. She is also a co-author of Calculus: Single and Multivariable (7th ed., Wiley, 2016), a text whose many other co-authors include Deborah Hughes Hallett, William G. McCallum, and Andrew M. Gleason.
