= Kathleen Madden =

American mathematician

Kathleen Marie Madden is an American mathematician who works in dynamical systems. She was the dean of the School of Natural Sciences, Mathematics, and Engineering at California State University, Bakersfield. She won the George Pólya Award and is the co-author of the book Discovering Discrete Dynamical Systems.

== Education and career ==
Madden did her undergraduate studies at the University of Colorado. She then spent two years with the Peace Corps teaching mathematics in Cameroon before returning to the US for graduate study. She completed her Ph.D. in 1994 at the University of Maryland, College Park; her dissertation, On the Existence and Consequences of Exotic Cocycles, was supervised by Nelson G. Markley.

Before joining California State University, Bakersfield as associate dean in 2015, she was a faculty member in the mathematics department at Lafayette College and then at Drew University, where she also served as chair of the department and associate dean. At California State University, Bakersfield, she was appointed interim dean in 2016 and permanent dean in 2017. She served in this position until 2021, at which time she retired to a part-time position in the faculty.

== Books and recognition ==
In 1998, Madden and Aimee Johnson won the George Pólya Award for their joint paper on aperiodic tiling, "Putting the Pieces Together: Understanding Robinson's Nonperiodic Tilings". In 2017, Madden, Johnson, and their co-author Ayşe Şahin published the textbook Discovering Discrete Dynamical Systems through the Mathematical Association of America.
