= Judith Grabiner =

American mathematician

Judith Victor Grabiner (born October 12, 1938) is an American mathematician and historian of mathematics, who is Flora Sanborn Pitzer Professor Emerita of Mathematics at Pitzer College, one of the Claremont Colleges. Her main interest is in mathematics in the eighteenth and nineteenth centuries.

== Education ==
Grabiner completed a Bachelor of Science degree at the University of Chicago in 1960. She was a graduate student in the history of science at Harvard University, completing a Master of Arts in 1962 and a Ph.D. in 1966, under I. Bernard Cohen. Her PhD dissertation was on Italian mathematician Joseph-Louis Lagrange.

== Career ==
Grabiner was an instructor at Harvard for several years, before she and her husband Sandy Grabiner moved to California. She was a professor of history at California State University, Dominguez Hills from 1972 to 1985.

Grabiner joined the mathematics department at Pitzer College in 1985, and has been the Flora Sanborn Pitzer Professor of Mathematics since 1994. Her teaching includes courses on the history of mathematics, mathematics in different cultures, and mathematics and philosophy.

== Recognition ==
Grabiner received the Carl B. Allendoerfer Award for the best article in Mathematics Magazine in 1984, 1989, and 1996, and the Lester R. Ford Award in 1984, 1998, 2005, and 2010, for the best article in American Mathematical Monthly.

In 2003, Grabiner received one of the Mathematical Association of America's Deborah and Franklin Haimo Awards for Distinguished College or University Teaching of Mathematics. She became a fellow of the American Mathematical Society in 2012. In 2014, she was awarded the Beckenbach Book Prize.

She was the 2021 winner of the Albert Leon Whiteman Memorial Prize of the American Mathematical Society "for her outstanding contributions to the history of mathematics, in particular her works on Cauchy, Lagrange, and MacLaurin; her widely-recognized gift for expository writing; and a distinguished career of teaching, lecturing, and numerous publications promoting a better understanding of mathematics and the significant roles it plays in culture generally".

== Books ==
- Grabiner, Judith V. (1981). The Origins of Cauchy's Rigorous Calculus. Dover (reprint); orig. MIT Press. ISBN 0-486-43815-5.
- Grabiner, Judith V. (1990). The Calculus as Algebra: J.-L. Lagrange, 1736-1813. Garland Science. ISBN 978-0-82407-448-7.
- Grabiner, Judith V. (2010). A Historian Looks Back: The Calculus as Algebra and Selected Writings. Mathematical Association of America. ISBN 978-0-88385-572-0. book details, Bookstore, American Mathematical Society
