= V. Frederick Rickey =

American mathematician

- Born: December 17, 1941
- Education: University of Notre Dame
- Known for: History of mathematics and its use in teaching mathematics
- Spouse: Joy McPherson Rickey
- Awards: George Pólya Award (1988)
- Scientific career
- Fields: Mathematics
- Workplaces: Bowling Green State University; United States Military Academy; University of Notre Dame; Indiana University at South Bend; University of Vermont
- Thesis: An Axiomatic Theory of Syntax (1968)
- Doctoral advisor: Bolesław Sobociński

Vincent Frederick Rickey (born 17 December 1941) is an American logician and historian of mathematics.

Rickey received his B.S. (1963), M.S. (1966), and Ph.D. (1968) from the University of Notre Dame in South Bend, Indiana. His Ph.D. was entitled An Axiomatic Theory of Syntax. He joined the academic staff of Ohio's Bowling Green State University in 1968, became there a full professor in 1979, and retired there in 1998. He was then a mathematics professor at the United States Military Academy from 1998 until his retirement in 2011. He was a visiting professor at the University of Notre Dame (1971–1972), Indiana University at South Bend (1977–1978), the University of Vermont (1984–1985), and the United States Military Academy (1989–1990). He was a Visiting Mathematician (1994–1995) at the Mathematical Association of America (MAA) headquarters in Washington, D.C., and while on this sabbatical he was involved in the founding of the undergraduate magazine Math Horizons.

He is an expert on the logical systems of Stanisław Leśniewski and has been a member of the editorial boards of the Notre Dame Journal of Formal Logic and The Philosopher's Index. Rickey has broad interests in the history of mathematics with a particular interest in the historical development of calculus and the use of this history to motivate and inspire students.

He is a multiple awardee. In 1993 he received the Deborah and Franklin Haimo Award for Distinguished College or University Teaching of Mathematics; he has also received the first statewide Distinguished Teaching Award from the Ohio section of the MAA, the Kappa Mu Epsilon honorary society award for Excellence in Teaching Mathematics (in 1991, 1988, 1975, and 1971), and the Outstanding Civilian Service Medal from the Department of the Army in 1990 for performance while serving as the visiting professor of mathematics at the United States Military Academy.

== Selected publications ==
- with Joe Albree & David C. Arney: A Station Favorable to the Pursuit of Science: Primary Materials in the History of Mathematics at the United States Military Academy. American Mathematical Society. 2000. ISBN 9780821890486.
- Bradley, Robert; Sandifer, Ed, eds. (2003). "A Reader's Guide to Euler's Introductio" (PDF). In: Proceedings, Euler 2K + 2 Conference held in Rumford, Maine, 4–7 August 2002. Euler Society. (See Introductio in analysin infinitorum.)
- Anderson, Marlow; Katz, Victor; Wilson, Robin, eds. (2004). "Isaac Newton: Man, Myth, and Mathematics". In: Sherlock Holmes in Babylon and Other Tales of Mathematical History. pp. 240–260. ISBN 9780883855461.
- Shell-Gellasch, Amy, ed. (2007). "Build a Brachistochrone And Captivate Your Class". In: Hands On History: A Resource for Teaching Mathematics. Mathematical Association of America. ISBN 9780883851821.
- with Shawnee McMurran: "The Impact of Ballistics on Mathematics". In: Proceedings of the 16th ARL/USMA Technical Symposium. 2008.
- with Amy Shell-Gellasch: “Mathematics Education at West Point: The First Hundred Years–Teaching at the Academy”. Convergence. July 2010.
- with Michael Huber: “What is 0^0?” Convergence . July 2012.
- with Theodore Crackel and Joel S. Silverberg: "George Washington's use of trigonometry and logarithms". Proceedings of the Canadian Society for History and Philosophy of Mathematics. 26: 98–115. 2014.
