= Introductio in analysin infinitorum =

Book by Leonhard Euler

Euler's number e corresponds to shaded area (under the hyperbola y = 1/x) equal to 1, introduced in chapter VII

Introductio in analysin infinitorum (Latin: Introduction to the Analysis of the Infinite) is a two-volume work by Leonhard Euler which lays the foundations of mathematical analysis. Written in Latin and published in 1748, the Introductio contains 18 chapters in the first part and 22 chapters in the second. It has Eneström numbers E101 and E102. It is considered the first precalculus book.

== Contents ==
Chapter 1 is on the concepts of variables and functions. Chapters 2 and 3 are concerned with the transformation of functions. Chapter 4 introduces infinite series through rational functions.

According to Henk Bos,

The Introduction is meant as a survey of concepts and methods in analysis and analytic geometry preliminary to the study of the differential and integral calculus. [Euler] made of this survey a masterly exercise in introducing as much as possible of analysis without using differentiation or integration. In particular, he introduced the elementary transcendental functions, the logarithm, the exponential function, the trigonometric functions and their inverses without recourse to integral calculus — which was no mean feat, as the logarithm was traditionally linked to the quadrature of the hyperbola and the trigonometric functions to the arc-length of the circle.

Euler accomplished this feat by introducing exponentiation a^{x} for arbitrary constant a in the positive real numbers. He noted that mapping x this way is not an algebraic function, but rather a transcendental function. For a > 1 these functions are monotonic increasing and form bijections of the real line with positive real numbers. Then each base a corresponds to an inverse function called the logarithm to base a, in chapter 6. In chapter 7, Euler introduces e as the number whose hyperbolic logarithm is 1, using the terminology established by Gregoire de Saint-Vincent, who defined what is now called the natural logarithm through quadrature of the hyperbola y = 1/x. Section 122 labels the logarithm to base e the "natural or hyperbolic logarithm...since the quadrature of the hyperbola can be expressed through these logarithms". Here he also gives the exponential series:

$$\exp(z) = \sum_{k = 0}^{\infty} {z^k \over k!} = 1 + z + {z^2 \over 2} + {z^3 \over 6} + {z^4 \over 24} + \cdots$$

Then in chapter 8 Euler is prepared to address the classical trigonometric functions as "transcendental quantities that arise from the circle." He uses the unit circle and presents Euler's formula. Chapter 9 considers trinomial factors in polynomials. Chapter 16 is concerned with partitions, a topic in number theory. Continued fractions are the topic of chapter 18.

== Impact ==
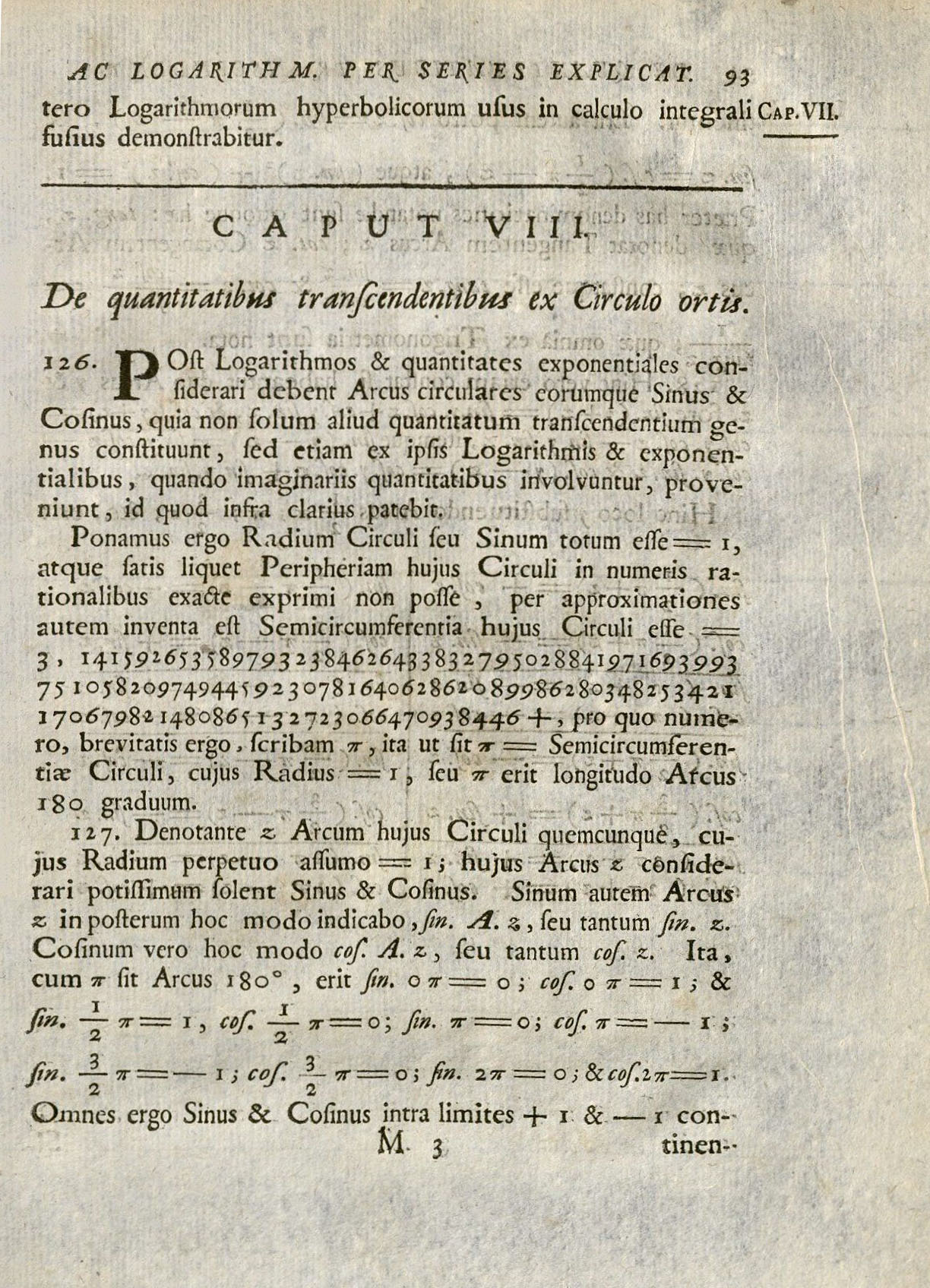
Page from Introductio in analysin infinitorum, 1748

Carl Benjamin Boyer's lectures at the 1950 International Congress of Mathematicians compared the influence of Euler's Introductio to that of Euclid's Elements, calling the Elements the foremost textbook of ancient times, and the Introductio "the foremost textbook of modern times". Boyer also wrote:

The analysis of Euler comes close to the modern orthodox discipline, the study of functions by means of infinite processes, especially through infinite series.
It is doubtful that any other essentially didactic work includes as large a portion of original material that survives in the college courses today...Can be read with comparative ease by the modern student...The prototype of modern textbooks.

== English translations ==
The first translation into English was that by John D. Blanton, published in 1988. The second, by Ian Bruce, is available online. A list of the editions of Introductio has been assembled by V. Frederick Rickey.

== Early mentions ==
- J.C. Scriba (2007) review of 1983 reprint of 1885 German edition MR 0715928

== Reviews of Blanton translation 1988 ==
- Doru Stefanescu MR 1025504
- Marco Panza (2007) MR 2384380
- Ricardo Quintero Zazueta (1999) MR 1823258
- Ernst Hairer & Gerhard Wanner (1996) Analysis by its History, chapter 1, pages 1 to 79, Undergraduate Texts in Mathematics #70, ISBN 978-0-387-77036-9 MR 1410751

== See also ==
- Contributions of Leonhard Euler to mathematics
