= Tracy Yerkes Thomas =

American mathematician

Tracy Y. Thomas
- Born: January 8, 1899; Alton, Illinois
- Died: March 23, 1983 (aged 84)
- Education: Rice University; Princeton University
- Scientific career
- Fields: Mathematics
- Thesis: The Geometry of Paths
- Doctoral advisor: Oswald Veblen
- Doctoral students: Carl B. Allendoerfer

Tracy Yerkes Thomas (January 8, 1899 – March 23, 1983) was an American mathematician.

== Biography ==
Thomas received his A.B. in 1921 from Rice University and then his A.M. in 1922 and Ph.D. in 1923 from Princeton University. For the academic year 1923–1924 he was a National Research Fellow in Physics at the University of Chicago and in the academic year 1924–1925 a postdoc in Zürich. For the academic year 1925–1926 he was a National Research Fellow in Mathematics at Harvard University and then Princeton University, where he was on the mathematics faculty from 1926 to 1938. From 1938 to 1944 he was a professor at the University of California, Los Angeles. From 1944 to 1969 he was a professor at Indiana University. In 1952, he was one of the founders of the Journal of Rational Mechanics and Analysis, which is now known as the Indiana University Mathematics Journal.

Thomas was in 1941 elected a member of the National Academy of Sciences.

In addition to many books, the best known of which are, The Differential Invariants of Generalized Spaces and Plastic Flow and Fracture in Solids, Professor Thomas wrote 172 research articles in such varied fields as the theory of relativity, plasticity, shock waves, tensors and differential geometry, the extended theory of condition for discontinuities over moving surfaces, and cosmology.

Early in his long and distinguished career, Tracy Thomas created theories of tensor calculus and generalized spaces. His treatise, The Differential Invariants of Generalized Spaces, was published in 1934 and remains a classic of the subject. He then turned his attention to the internal friction of fluids and was able to establish the stabilizing effect of this friction in some cases. He went on to solve a famous open problem concerning the motion of pairs of bodies. There followed a long series of studies of the shock waves that form ahead of object moving at supersonic speed, and to examine the plastic flow of metals under great loading.

Upon his death, he was survived by his wife, Virginia Rowland Thomas, and son, Tracy Alexander Thomas.

== Selected publications ==
=== Articles ===
- The Einstein Equations of the Gravitational Field for an Arbitrary Distribution of Matter. Proceedings of the National Academy of Sciences 9, no. 8 (1923): 275–278.
- with Oswald Veblen: The geometry of paths. Trans. Amer. Math. Soc. 25 (1923) 551–608. MR 1501260
- with Oswald Veblen: Extensions of relative tensors. Trans. Amer. Math. Soc. 26 (1924) 373–377. MR 1501284
- Note on the projective geometry of paths. Bull. Amer. Math. Soc. 31 (1925) 318–322. MR 1561053
- On the projective and equi-projective geometries of paths. Proceedings of the National Academy of Sciences 11, no. 4 (1925): 199–203.
- On conformal geometry. Proceedings of the National Academy of Sciences 12, no. 5 (1926): 352–359.
- with Jack Levine: On a class of existence theorems in differential geometry. Bull. Amer. Math. Soc. 40 (1934) 721–728. MR 1562961
- Algebraic characterizations in complex differential geometry. Trans. Amer. Math. Soc. 38 (1935) 501–514. MR 1501825
- On the metric representations of affinely connected spaces. Bull. Amer. Math. Soc. 42 (1936) 77–78. MR 1563242
- On the singular point locus in the theory of fields of parallel vectors. Bull. Amer. Math. Soc. 45 (1939) 436–441. MR 1564000
- Imbedding theorems in differential geometry. Bull. Amer. Math. Soc. 45 (1939) Part 1:841–850. MR 0000532
- On the uniform convergence of the solutions of the Navier-Stokes equations. Proceedings of the National Academy of Sciences 29, no. 8 (1943): 243–246.
- Algebraic determination of the second fundamental form of a surface by its mean curvature. Bull. Amer. Math. Soc. 51 (1945) Part 1:390–399. MR 0012494
- The fundamental theorem on quadratic first integrals. Proceedings of the National Academy of Sciences 32, no. 1 (1946): 10–15.
- Combined elastic and Prandtl-Reuss stress-strain relations. Proceedings of the National Academy of Sciences 41, no. 10 (1955): 720–726.
- On the stress-strain relations for cubic crystals. Proceedings of the National Academy of Sciences 55, no. 2 (1966): 235–239.

=== Books ===
- The elementary theory of tensors, with applications to geometry and mechanics. McGraw-Hill. 1931; ix+122 pages
- The differential invariants of generalized spaces. Vol. 75. Cambridge University Press. 1934; 240 pages
- Concepts from tensor analysis and differential geometry. Academic Press. 1961. ISBN 9780080957784; vii+119 pages
- Plastic flow and fracture in solids. Elsevier. 1961; 267 pages
