= Charles W. Groetsch =

American mathematician

Charles (Chuck) William Groetsch (born February 15, 1945, in New Orleans) is an American applied mathematician and numerical analyst.

== Education and career ==
Groetsch graduated from the University of New Orleans with B.S. in 1966 and M.S. in 1968. He was from 1966 to 1968 an engineer and applied mathematician in Boeing's Space Division, Launch Systems Branch. In 1971 he received his PhD in mathematics from Louisiana State University in 1971. At the University of Cincinnati he was an assistant professor from 1971 to 1975, an associate professor from 1976 to 1981, and a full professor from 1981 to 2006. There he was head of the department of mathematical sciences from 1985 to 1990. At The Citadel, the Military College of South Carolina, he was the founding dean of the School of Science and Mathematics from 2006 to 2011 and is the Citadel Distinguished Professor of Mathematical Science since 2011.

He has held visiting positions at several universities. He has given invited lectures at 18 different international symposia. He was the co-editor of the Journal of Integral Equations & Applications from 2002 to 2008. He was on the editorial boards of SIAM Review from 1992 to 1996 and the Journal of Mathematical Analysis & Applications from 1996 to 2005. He is on the editorial boards of Numerical Functional Analysis and Optimization since 1986, the Electronic Journal of Differential Equations since 1992, the Journal of Integral Equations & Applications since 1994–2008, the International Journal of Pure and Applied Mathematics since 2000, and the Electronic Journal of Mathematical and Physical Sciences since 2002.

His research deals with inverse and ill-posed problems, integral equations of the first kind, regularization theory, numerical analysis, approximation theory, applied mathematics, and history of mathematics. He is the author or co-author of over 100 articles in refereed journals.

In 1994 Groetsch (and Dan Kalman, independently) received the Mathematical Association of America's George Pólya Award. In 2010 Groetsch was elected a fellow of the American Association for the Advancement of Science (AAAS). In 2010 two special issues (volume 22, issues 2 & 3) of the Journal of Integral Equations and Applications were dedicated to him in honor of his “fundamental contributions to the field of inverse problems.”
