= Maya Bar-Hillel =

Israeli psychologist (born 1943)

- מיה בר-הלל
- Born: 1943 (age 82–83)

Academic background
- Education: Hebrew University of Jerusalem (PhD)
- Thesis: The Base-Rate Fallacy in Subjective Judgments of Probability (1975)

Academic work
- Discipline: Psychologist
- Sub-discipline: Probability; Decision theory
- Institutions: Hebrew University of Jerusalem

Maya Bar-Hillel (Hebrew: מיה בר-הלל; born 1943) is a professor emeritus of psychology at the Hebrew University of Jerusalem. Known for her work on inaccuracies in human reasoning about probability, she has also studied decision theory in connection with Newcomb's paradox, investigated how gender stereotyping can block human problem-solving, and worked with Dror Bar-Natan, Gil Kalai, and Brendan McKay to debunk the Bible code.

== Education and career ==
Bar-Hillel studied psychology with Amos Tversky at the Hebrew University, where she earned bachelor's and master's degrees in mathematics and a Ph.D. in psychology. Her 1975 doctoral dissertation, The Base-Rate Fallacy in Subjective Judgments of Probability, introduced the concept of the base rate fallacy in probabilistic reasoning. At the Hebrew University, she was the director of the Center for the Study of Rationality from 2001 to 2005.

== Family ==
Bar-Hillel is the daughter of Israeli philosopher and linguist Yehoshua Bar-Hillel. Her daughter, Gili Bar-Hillel, is the Hebrew translator of the Harry Potter books.

== Recognition ==
Bar-Hillel won the Rothschild Prize for Psychology in 2018, and the George Pólya Award of the Mathematical Association of America with Ruma Falk in 1984 for their joint work on probability.
