= Israel Kleiner (mathematician) =

Canadian mathematician and historian

Israel Kleiner is a Canadian mathematician and historian of mathematics.

Kleiner earned an MA at Yale University (1963) and a PhD at McGill University (1967) under Joachim Lambek with a thesis Lie modules and rings of quotients. Before his retirement as professor emeritus, he spent his career as a mathematics professor at York University, where he was a member of the faculty since 1965 and where he coordinated the training program for mathematics teachers teaching at the secondary school level. He is noted for his work on the history of algebra and on the combination of the history of mathematics and mathematics education.

He received the Carl B. Allendoerfer Award in 1987 and again in 1992, the George Pólya Award in 1990, and the Lester Randolph Ford Award in 1995. He was in the mid 2000s vice-president of the Canadian Society for the History and Philosophy of Mathematics.

== Selected works ==
=== Books ===
- Turning Points in the History of Mathematics (with Hardy Grant), Birkhäuser 2016
- Excursions in the History of Mathematics, Springer 2012
- A History of Abstract Algebra, Birkhäuser 2007
- Selected Papers in the History of Mathematics , in Hebrew, Maalot Academic Publishers, 1994.
- A History of Abstract Algebra, in Korean, Kyung Moon Publ., 2012. (Translation of the 2007 Birkhäuser edition; see above)
- A History of Abstract Algebra, in Japanese, The English Agency (Japan) Ltd., 2011. (Translation of the 2007 Birkhäuser edition; see above)

=== Articles ===
- Abstract (modern) algebra in America (1870-1950): a brief account. In: A Century of Advancing Mathematics, Math. Assoc. of America, 2015, pp. 191–216
- Intellectual courage and mathematical creativity (with N. Movshovitz-Hadar). In: Creativity in Mathematics and the Education of Gifted Students, ed. by R. Leiken, A. Berman, and B. Koichu, Sense Publishers, 2009, pp. 31–50
- The roots of commutative algebra in algebraic number theory, Mathematics Magazine, Vol. 68, 1995, pp. 3–15
- The principle of continuity: a brief history, Mathematical Intelligencer, Vol. 28, No. 4, 2006, pp. 49–57
- Fermat: The founder of modern number theory, Mathematics Magazine, Vol. 78, 2005, pp. 3–14
- From Fermat to Wiles: Fermat's Last Theorem becomes a theorem, Elemente der Mathematik, Vol. 55, 2000, pp. 19–37
- Field theory: from equations to axiomatization, Parts 1 and 2, American Mathematical Monthly, Vol. 106, 1999, pp. 677–684 and 859-863
- A historically focused course on abstract algebra, Mathematics Magazine, Vol. 71, 1998, pp. 105–111
- From numbers to rings: an early history of ring theory, Elemente der Mathematik, Vol. 53, 1998, pp. 18–35
- Proof: a many-splendored thing (with N. Movshovitz-Hadar), The Mathematical Intelligencer, Vol. 19, No. 3, 1997, pp. 16–26
- The genesis of the abstract ring concept, American Mathematical Monthly, Vol. 103, 1996, pp. 417–423
- The role of paradoxes in the evolution of mathematics (with Nitsa Movshovitz-Hadar), The American Mathematical Monthly, Vol. 101, No. 10, 1994, pp. 963-974 (1995 Lester R. Ford Award)
- The teaching of abstract algebra: an historical perspective, in Frank Swetz, Otto Bekken, Bengt Johansson, John Fauvel, Victor Katz (eds.) Learn from the masters, MAA 1994, pp. 225–239
- Emmy Noether: highlights of her life and work, L´Enseignement Mathematique, Vol. 38, 1992, pp. 103–124
- Rigor and proof in mathematics: a historical perspective, Mathematics Magazine, Vol. 64, 1991, pp. 291-314 (1992 Allendoerfer Award)
- Evolution of the function concept: a brief survey, The College Mathematics Journal, Vol. 20, 1989, No. 4, pp. 282-300 (1990 Polya Award)
- Thinking the unthinkable: the story of complex numbers (with a moral), Mathematics Teacher, Vol. 81, 1988, pp. 583–592
- A sketch of the evolution of (non-commutative) ring theory, L´Enseignement Mathematique, Vol. 33, 1987, pp. 227–267
- The evolution of group theory: a brief survey, Mathematics Magazine, Vol. 59, 1986, pp. 195-215 (1987 Allendoerfer Award), reprinted in G. L. Alexanderson, The harmony of the world: 75 years of Mathematics Magazine, MAA 2007, pp. 213–228
