= Aimee Johnson =

American mathematician

Aimee Sue Anastasia Johnson is an American mathematician who works in dynamical systems. She is a professor of mathematics at Swarthmore College, the winner of the George Pólya Award, and the co-author of the book Discovering Discrete Dynamical Systems.

Johnson graduated from the University of California, Berkeley in 1984. She completed her Ph.D. in 1990 at the University of Maryland, College Park; her dissertation, Measures on the Circle Invariant for a Nonlacunary Subsemigroup of the Integers, was supervised by Daniel Rudolph.

In dynamical systems, Johnson is known for her work on a conjecture of Hillel Furstenberg on the classification of invariant measures for the action of two independent modular multiplication operations on an interval. In 1998, Johnson and Kathleen Madden won the George Pólya Award for their joint paper on aperiodic tiling, "Putting the Pieces Together: Understanding Robinson's Nonperiodic Tilings". In 2017, Madden, Johnson, and their co-author Ayşe Şahin published the textbook Discovering Discrete Dynamical Systems through the Mathematical Association of America. With Joseph Auslander and Cesar E. Silva she is also the co-editor of Ergodic Theory, Dynamical Systems, and the Continuing Influence of John C. Oxtoby (Contemporary Mathematics 678, American Mathematical Society, 2016).
