= Christiane Rousseau =

Canadian mathematician

Christiane Rousseau OC OQ (born March 30, 1954, in Versailles, France) is a French and Canadian mathematician, a professor in the department of mathematics and statistics at the Université de Montréal. She was president of the Canadian Mathematical Society from 2002 to 2004.

== Education and career ==
Rousseau earned her Ph.D. from the Université de Montréal in 1977, under the supervision of Dana Schlomiuk, with a thesis entitled "Topos Theory and Complex Analysis". After postdoctoral research at McGill University, she joined the Montréal faculty in 1979, and was promoted to full professor in 1991. She was interim Director of Centre de Recherches Mathématiques from 2008 to 2009.

She was the first female vice-president of the International Mathematical Union, from 2011 to 2014. She implemented and led the Mathematics on Planet Earth initiative in 2013 (MPE 2013), supported by UNESCO, and played a leading role in having March 14 declared the International Day of Mathematics by UNESCO.

== Scientific work ==
Rousseau's main areas of research are differential equations and dynamical systems. This includes work on singularities of differential equations, bifurcation theory, Hilbert's sixteenth problem (the part about differential equations) as well as analysis of important differential equations in mathematical biology such as the predator-prey Lotka–Volterra equations. Other scientific interests include applications of Lie algebra to the Grand Unified Theory.

She actively participates in mathematics popularization programs in high schools and cégeps, namely through presentations as well as the publication of over 35 vulgarization articles in the Accromath journal.

== Recognition ==
She has received the Adrien-Pouliot Prize and the Abel-Gauthier Prize of the Mathematical Association of Québec, and the 2009 Graham Wright Award for Distinguished Service from the Canadian Mathematical Society. She also received the 2014 George Pólya Award of the Mathematical Association of America for her article about a discovery by Inge Lehmann, "How Inge Lehmann Discovered the Inner Core of the Earth". In 2012, she became a fellow of the American Mathematical Society (AMS). In 2017 she became the inaugural recipient of the AMS' Bertrand Russell prize for furthering human values and the common good through mathematics. In 2018 the Canadian Mathematical Society listed her in their inaugural class of fellows.

In 2024, she was appointed as an officer to the Order of Canada. She lives in Mont-Saint-Grégoire, Quebec.
