= Vesna Stojanoska =

Mathematician

Vesna Stojanoska is a mathematician whose research focuses on stable homotopy theory, chromatic homotopy theory, Serre duality, and related topics in algebraic topology and arithmetic topology. Originally from North Macedonia, she works in the United States as a professor and Norman P. Jones Professorial Scholar in the Department of Mathematics at the University of Illinois Urbana-Champaign.

== Education and career ==
Stojanoska is originally from Macedonia. As a high school student, she competed for the Republic of Macedonia in the 2000 and 2002 International Mathematical Olympiads, receiving a bronze medal in 2002. After undergraduate studies at the American University in Bulgaria, She completed her Ph.D. in mathematics at Northwestern University in 2011. Her dissertation, Duality for Topological Modular Forms, was supervised by Paul Goerss.

She became a postdoctoral researcher at the Massachusetts Institute of Technology, working with Haynes Miller, in California, as a Viterbi Endowed Postdoctoral Scholar at the Mathematical Sciences Research Institute, and in Germany, at the Max Planck Institute for Mathematics in Bonn. She joined the University of Illinois Urbana-Champaign as an assistant professor in 2015.

== Recognition ==
Stojanoska was a 2009 recipient of the Carl B. Allendoerfer Award for expository writing in mathematics, for a paper she wrote as an undergraduate at the American University in Bulgaria, with Orlin Stoytchev, on the fundamental group of the 3D rotation group.

She was a 2022 Simons Fellow in Mathematics, and was elected to the 2026 class of Fellows of the American Mathematical Society.
