= Sally Cockburn =

Canadian mathematician

Sally Patricia Cockburn (born 1960) is a mathematician whose research ranges from algebraic topology and set theory to geometric graph theory and combinatorial optimization. A Canadian immigrant to the US, she is William R. Kenan Jr. Professor of Mathematics at Hamilton College, and former chair of the mathematics department at Hamilton.

== Education and career ==
Cockburn is originally from Ottawa. She earned a bachelor's and master's degree from Queen's University in Ontario, in 1982 and 1984 respectively, and also has a master's degree from the University of Ottawa.

Following receipt of her master's degree, she taught math at a Maru-a-Pula_School, a private secondary school in Gaborone, Botswana.

She completed her Ph.D. in algebraic topology in 1991 from Yale University. Her dissertation, The Gamma-Filtration on Extra-Special $P$-Groups, was supervised by Ronnie Lee.

She joined the Hamilton College faculty in 1991 and was promoted to full professor in 2014. At Hamilton, she has also served as the coach for the college's squash team.

== Recognition ==
Cockburn won the 2014 Carl B. Allendoerfer Award of the Mathematical Association of America with Joshua Lesperance for their joint work, "deranged socks", on a variation of the problem of counting derangements.
