= John A. Adam (mathematician) =

British-American applied mathematician

John Anthony Adam is a British-American applied mathematician known for his work on patterns in nature and on mathematical modeling of the growth patterns of cancer and blood vessels. He is University Professor of Mathematics at Old Dominion University in Virginia.

== Education and career ==
Adam is a 1971 graduate, with first-class honours, from Queen Elizabeth College. He completed his Ph.D. in 1974 at University College London. His dissertation, A Theoretical Study of Magnetohydrodynamic Processes in Solar Active Regions, was jointly supervised by astrochemist Gillian Peach and astrophysicist Carole Jordan.

After working as a researcher in theoretical astronomy and applied mathematics, respectively at the University of Sussex and University of St Andrews, he became a lecturer in mathematics at the New University of Ulster in 1978, while also taking a research affiliation at the Dublin Institute for Advanced Studies. In 1983 he came to the US as a Fulbright scholar at the University of Rochester, and in 1984 he moved to Old Dominion University. He was named University Professor there in 1999.

== Book ==
Adam is the author of books including:

- A Survey of Models for Tumor-Immune System Dynamics (edited with Nicola Bellomo, Springer, 1997)
- Mathematics in Nature: Modeling Patterns in the Natural World (Princeton University Press, 2003)
- Guesstimation: Solving the World's Problems on the Back of a Cocktail Napkin (with Lawrence Weinstein, Princeton University Press, 2008)
- A Mathematical Nature Walk (Princeton University Press, 2009)
- X and the City: Modeling Aspects of Urban Life (Princeton University Press, 2012)
- Rays, Waves, and Scattering: Topics in Classical Mathematical Physics (Princeton University Press, 2017)

== Recognition ==
In 2007, the State Council of Higher Education in Virginia (SCHEV) gave Adam their Outstanding Faculty Award.

In 2012, Adam won the Carl B. Allendoerfer Award of the Mathematical Association of America for an exposition of blood vessel modeling.
