= Opera Roanoke =

Opera company in Roanoke, Virginia, US

Opera Roanoke is professional opera company based in Roanoke, Virginia. The institution presents fully staged productions and a variety of smaller-scale presentations each year. The company is resident in the Shaftman Performance Hall in Roanoke's Jefferson Center.

== History ==
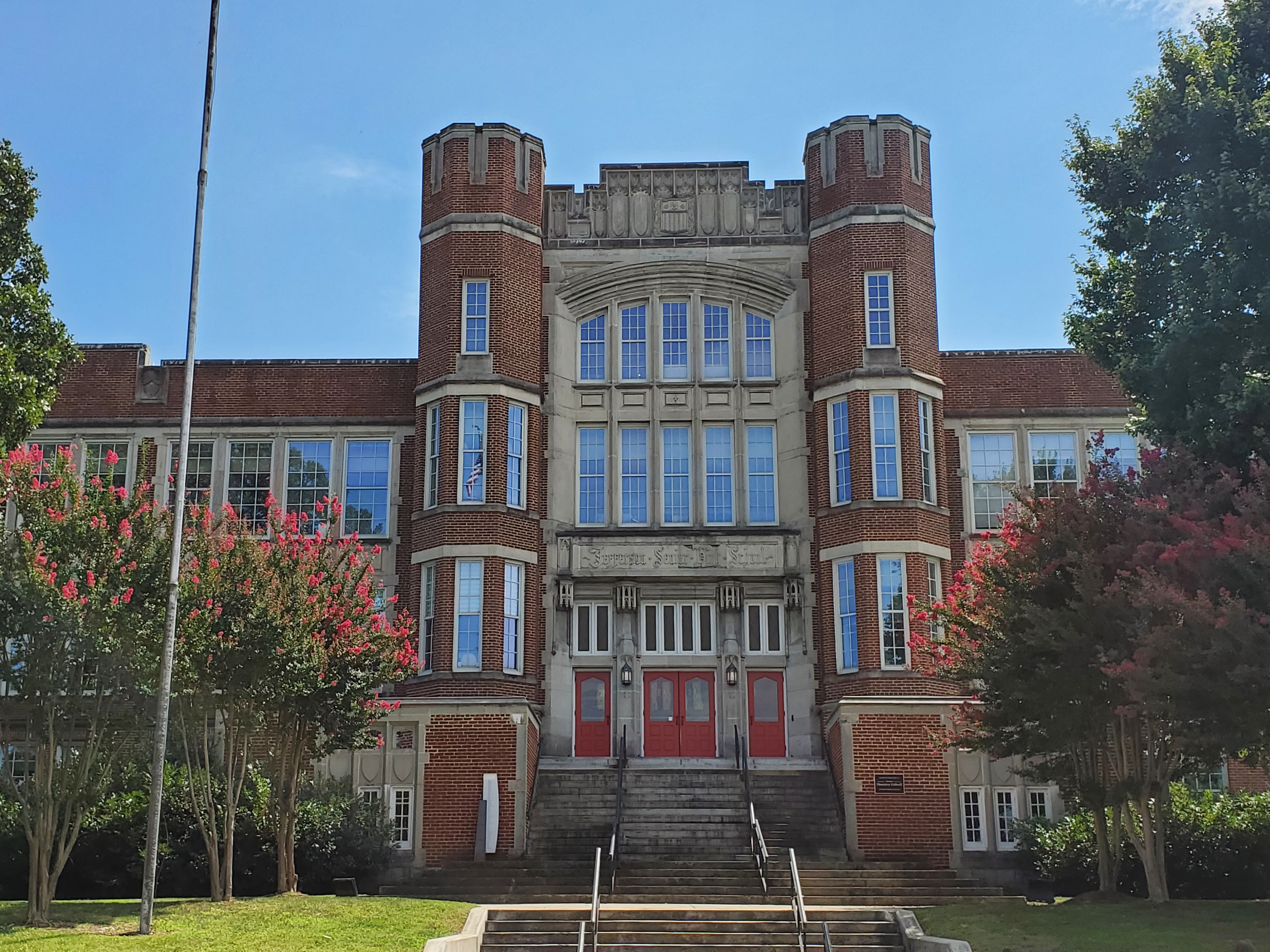
The Jefferson Center in 2023

The company was founded in 1976 as the Southwest Virginia Opera Society. Its inaugural production, Menotti's The Consul, was mounted in May 1977. Performances of The Marriage of Figaro and Die Fledermaus constituted the 1978-1979 season. The group became a professional company in 1989, and changed its name to Opera Roanoke in 1991. It and the Roanoke Symphony Orchestra moved their headquarters to the newly-remodeled Jefferson Center in 1992.

In 2006, the company celebrated its 30th Season with main stage productions of La Boheme and Macbeth. The institution moved its headquarters in 2007, joining the Downtown Music Lab as the first tenants of the renovated Dumas Center for Artistic and Cultural Development. Three years later, however, the headquarters were moved again, this time to the downtown Roanoke arts and culture hub Center in the Square.
