= Carl B. Allendoerfer Award =

The Carl B. Allendoerfer Award is presented annually by the Mathematical Association of America (MAA) for "expository excellence published in Mathematics Magazine." it is named after mathematician Carl B. Allendoerfer who was president of the MAA 1959–60.

== Recipients ==
Recipients of the Carl B. Allendoerfer Award have included:

Recipient	Year	Article
John Chase and Matthew Wright	2024	Bacterial Growth: Not So Simple
Alissa S. Crans and Glen T. Whitney	2024	Integral Tiling Pentagons
Tien Chih and Demitri Plessas	2023	A Search for Champion Boxers
Steven J. Brams and Peter S. Landweber	2023	Three Persons, Two Cuts: A New Cake-Cutting Algorithm
David Hunter and Chisondi Warioba	2022	Segregation Surfaces
Kaity Parsons, Peter Tingley and Emma Zajdela	2022	When to Hold ‘Em
Nancy Ho, James Godzik, Jennifer Jones, Thomas W. Mattman, and Dan Sours	2021	Invisible Knots and Rainbow Rings: Knots Not Determined by Their Determinants
Jocelyn R. Bell and Frank Wattenberg	2021	The Slippery Duck Theorem
Beth Malmskog and Kathryn Haymaker	2020	What (Quilting) Circles Can Be Squared?
Juan Arias de Reyna, David Clark, and Noam Elkies	2020	A Modern Solution to the Gion Shrine Problem
William Dunham	2019	The Early (and Peculiar) History of the Möbius Function
Jordan Bell and Viktor Blåsjö	2019	Pietro Mengoli’s 1650 Proof that the Harmonic Series Diverges
Fumiko Futamura and Robert Lehr	2018	A New Perspective on Finding the Viewpoint
Brian Conrey, James Gabbard, Katie Grant, Andrew Liu, and Kent Morrison	2017	Intransitive Dice
Vladimir Pozdnyakov and J. Michael Steele	2017	Buses, Bullies, and Bijections
Julia Barnes, Clinton Curry, Elizabeth Russell, and Lisbeth Schaubroeck	2016	Emerging Julia Sets
Irl Bivens and Ben Klein	2016	The Median Value of a Continuous Function
Daniel Heath	2015	Straightedge and Compass Constructions in Spherical Geometry
Andrew Beveridge and Stan Wagon	2015	The Sorting Hat Goes to College
Sally Cockburn and Joshua Lesperance	2014	Deranged Socks
Susan Marshall and Donald Smith	2014	Feedback, Control, and Distribution of Prime Numbers
Khristo N. Boyadzhiev	2013	Close Encounters with the Stirling Numbers of the Second Kind
Adrian Rice and Ezra A. Brown	2013	Why Ellipses Are Not Elliptic Curves
P. Mark Kayll	2012	Integrals Don't Have Anything to Do with Discrete Math, Do They?
John A. Adam	2012	Blood Vessel Branching: Beyond the Standard Calculus Problem
Curtis D. Bennett, Blake Mellor, and Patrick Shanahan	2011	Drawing a Triangle on the Thurston Model of Hyperbolic Space
Gene Abrams and Jessica Sklar	2011	The Graph Menagerie: Abstract Algebra and the Mad Veterinarian
David Speyer and Bernd Sturmfels	2010	Tropical Mathematics
Ezra Brown and Keith Mellinger	2010	Kirkman's Schoolgirls Wearing Hats and Walking Through Fields of Numbers
Jeff Suzuki	2009	A Brief History of Impossibility
Vesna Stojanoska and Orlin Stoytchev	2009	Touching the $\mathbb{Z}_2$ in Three-Dimensional Rotations
Chris Christensen	2009	Polish Mathematicians Finding Patterns in Enigma Messages
Eugene Boman, Richard Brazier, and Derek Seiple	2008	Mom! There's an Astroid in My Closet!
Saul Stahl	2008	The Evolution of the Normal Distribution
Carl V. Lutzer	2007	Hammer Juggling, Rotational Instability, and Eigenvalues
Jeff Suzuki	2006	The Lost Calculus (1637-1670): Tangency and Optimization without Limits
Robb T. Koether and John K. Osinach, Jr.	2006	Outwitting the Lying Oracle
Roger B. Eggleton and William P. Galvin	2005	Upper Bounds on the Sum of Principal Divisors of an Integer
Charles I. Delman and Gregory Galperin	2004	A Tale of Three Circles
Ezra Brown	2003	The Many Names of (7,3,1)
Dan Kalman	2003	Doubly Recursive Multivariate Automatic Differentiation
Mark McKinzie and Curtis Tuckey	2002	Higher Trigonometry, Hyperreal Numbers, and Euler's Analysis of Infinities
James N. Brawner	2001	Dinner, Dancing, and Tennis, Anyone?
Raphael Falk Jones and Janice L. Pearce	2001	A Postmodern View of Fractions and the Reciprocals of Fermat Primes
Donald Teets and Karen Whitehead	2000	The Discovery of Ceres: How Gauss Became Famous
Donald G. Saari and Fabrice Valognes	1999	Geometry, Voting, and Paradoxes
Victor Klee and John R. Reay	1999	A Surprising but Easily Proved Geometric Decomposition Theorem
Dan Kalman, Robert Mena, and Shahriar Shahriari	1998	Variations on an Irrational Theme-Geometry, Dynamics, Algebra
Lin Tan	1997	The Group of Rational Points on the Unit Circle
Colm Mulcahy	1997	Plotting and Scheming with Wavelets
Daniel J. Velleman and Gregory S. Call	1996	Permutations and Combination Locks
Judith Grabiner	1996	Descartes and Problem-Solving
Tristan Needham	1995	The Geometry of Harmonic Functions
Lee Badgett	1995	Lazzarini's Lucky Approximation of pi
Joan P. Hutchinson	1994	Coloring Ordinary Maps, Maps of Empires, and Maps of the Moon
Xun-Cheng Huang	1993	From Intermediate Value Theorem to Chaos
David Logothetti	1992	Cube Slices, Pictorial Triangles, and Probability
Israel Kleiner	1992	Rigor and Proof in Mathematics: A Historical Perspective
Gulbank D. Chakerian	1992	Cube Slices, Pictorial Triangles, and Probability
Ranjan Roy	1991	The Discovery of the Series Formula for π by Leibniz, Gregory, and Nilakantha
Ronald L. Graham	1990	
Martin Gardner	1990	
Fan Chung	1990	Steiner Trees on a Checkerboard
Thomas Archibald	1990	Connectivity and Smoke-Rings: Green's Second Identity in Its First Fifty Years
Kenneth C. Millett	1989	
W.B. Raymond Lickorish	1989	The New Polynomial Invariants of Knots and Links
Judith Grabiner	1989	The Centrality of Mathematics in the History of Western Thought
Steven Galovich	1988	Products of Sines and Cosines
Bart Braden	1988	Pólya's Geometric Picture of Complex Contour Integrals
Paul Zorn	1987	The Bieberbach Conjecture
Israel Kleiner	1987	The Evolution of Group Theory: A Brief Survey
Saul Stahl	1986	The Other Map Coloring Theorem
Bart Braden	1986	Design of an Oscillating Sprinkler
Philip D. Straffin, Jr.	1985	Parliamentary Coalitions: A Tour of Models
Bernard Grofman	1985	
Frederick S. Gass	1985	Constructive Ordinal Notation Systems
Judith Grabiner	1984	The Changing Concept of Change: The Derivative from Fermat to Weierstrass
Clifford Wagner	1983	A Generic Approach to Iterative Methods
Donald Koehler	1983	Mathematics and Literature
Marjorie Senechal	1982	Which Tetrahedra Fill Space?
J. Ian Richards	1982	Continued Fractions without Tears
Donald E. Sanderson	1981	Advanced Plane Topology from an Elementary Standpoint
Stephen B. Maurer	1981	The King Chicken Theorems
Ernst Snapper	1980	The Three Crises in Mathematics: Logicism, Intuitionism, and Formalism
Victor Klee	1980	Some Unsolved Problems in Plane Geometry
Doris Schattschneider	1979	Tiling the Plane with Congruent Pentagons
Bruce C. Berndt	1979	Ramanujan's Notebooks
David A. Smith	1978	Human Population Growth: Stability or Explosion?
Geoffrey C. Shephard	1978	Tilings by Regular Polygons
Branko Grünbaum	1978	
B.L. van der Waerden	1977	Hamilton's Discovery of Quaternions
Joseph A. Gallian	1977	The Search for Finite Simple Groups

== See also ==
- List of mathematics awards
