= The College Mathematics Journal =

Journal aimed at instructors

- Cover of November 2007 issue
- Editor: Dominic Klyve
- Former editors: Brian Hopkins, Bart Braden, Underwood Dudley, Lowell Beineke, Michael Henle, Ann Watkins, Warren Page
- Categories: Mathematics
- Frequency: 5/year
- Paid circulation: 9,000
- Unpaid circulation: 500
- Total circulation: 9,500
- First issue: 1970
- Company: Taylor & Francis for the Mathematical Association of America
- Country: United States
- Based in: Washington, D.C.
- Language: English
- Website: http://www.maa.org/pubs/cmj.html
- ISSN: 0746-8342

The College Mathematics Journal is an expository magazine aimed at teachers of college mathematics, particularly those teaching the first two years. It is published by Taylor & Francis on behalf of the Mathematical Association of America and is a continuation of the Two-Year College Mathematics Journal. It covers all aspects of mathematics. It publishes articles intended to enhance undergraduate instruction and classroom learning, including expository articles, short notes, problems, and "mathematical ephemera" such as fallacious proofs, quotations, cartoons, poetry, and humour. Paid circulation in 2008 was 9,000, and total circulation was 9,500.

The MAA gives the George Pólya Awards annually "for articles of expository excellence" published in the College Mathematics Journal.
