= Shahriar Shahriari =

American mathematician

Shahriar Shahriari (born May 30, 1956) is an American mathematician. He is the William Polk Russell Professor of Mathematics at Pomona College.

== Early life and education ==
Shahriari was born on May 30, 1956, in Tehran, Iran, to Parviz and Zomorod Shahriari. He attended Oberlin College, graduating in 1977, and subsequently received his doctorate from the University of Wisconsin–Madison in 1986.

== Career ==
Shahriari began teaching at Pomona College in 1989. In 2006, he published a calculus textbook titled Approximately Calculus.

== Recognition ==
In 1998, Shahriari shared the Carl B. Allendoerfer Award with Dan Kalman and Robert Mena for their paper "Variations on an irrational theme—Geometry, dynamics, algebra". In 2015, he received a Mathematical Association of America Deborah and Franklin Tepper Haimo Award for Distinguished Teaching in Mathematics.
