= George Pólya Award =

- Description: Articles of expository excellence
- Location: United States
- Presented by: Mathematical Association of America
- First award: 1976
- Currently held by: Tova Brown & Brody Johnson (2025); Jason Snyder (2025)
- Website: maa.org/george-polya-awards/

The George Pólya Award is presented annually by the Mathematical Association of America (MAA) for articles of expository excellence that have been published in the College Mathematics Journal. The award was established in 1976, and up to two awards of $1,000 each are given each year. The award is named after Hungarian mathematician George Pólya.

== Recipients ==
Recipients of the George Pólya Award have included:

Year	Recipient	Article
2025	Tova Brown and Brody Johnson	Pull-Back Cars: Vehicles for the Instruction of Differential Equations
2025	Jason Snyder	A Modern Spin on Archimedes' Quadrature of the Parabola
2024	Damiano Fulghesu, James A. Sellers and Courtney K. Taylor	Infinite Families of Infinite Series with Integer Sums
2024	William Dunham	Bryn Mawr College Matriculation Exams from a Century Ago
2023	William Q. Erickson	Haste Makes Waste: An Optimization Problem
2023	Johnner Barrett	Unlawful Calculations: A Look into Lie’s Notebook
2022	Joseph Previte and Michelle Previte	The Beautiful Chaotic Dynamics of iz
2022	Adrian Rice and Ezra Brown	Why Hamilton Couldn’t Multiply Triples
2021	Holly Middleton-Spencer and James Christian	On the Nth Roots of -1 and Complex Basin Boundaries: Fractals from Newton-Raphson
2021	Adam Hammett	Euler's Limit and Stirling's Estimate
2020	Adam Glesser, Matt Rathbun, Isabel M. Serrano, Bogdan Suceavă	Eclectic Illuminism: Applications of Affine Geometry
2020	Christopher J. Catone	Bringing Calculus into Discrete Math via the Discrete Derivative
2019	Stanley R. Huddy and Michael A. Jones	The Calculus Behind Generic Drug Equivalence
2019	Peter McGrath	Newton’s Shell Theorem via Archimedes’ Hat Box and Single Variable Calculus
2018	Ben Blum-Smith and Samuel Coskey	Fundamental Theorem on Symmetric Polynomials: History’s First Whiff of Galois Theory
2018	Stephen Kaczkowski	Mathematical Models for Global Mean Sea Level Rise
2017	Viktor Blåsjö	How to Find the Logarithm of Any Number Using Nothing But a Piece of String
2017	Travis Kowalski	The Sine of a Single Degree
2016	Gordon Hamilton, Kiran S. Kedlaya, and Henri Picciotto	Square-Sum Pair Partitions
2016	Hassan Boualem and Robert Brouzet	To Be (a Circle) or Not To Be?
2015	Michael Brilleslyper and Lisbeth Schaubroeck	Locating Unimodular Roots
2015	David Joyner	The Man Who Found God's Number
2014	Adam E. Parker	Who Solved the Bernoulli Differential Equation and How Did They Do It?
2014	Christiane Rousseau	How Inge Lehmann Discovered the Inner Core of the Earth
2013	Jacob Siehler	The Finite Lamplighter Groups: A Guided Tour
2013	David Applegate, Marc LeBrun, and Neil J. A. Sloane	Carryless Arithmetic Mod 10
2012	Leslie A. Cheteyan, Stewart Hengveld, and Michael A. Jones	Chutes and Ladders for the Impatient
2012	T. S. Michael	Guards, Galleries, Fortresses, and the Octoplex
2011	Jonathan K. Hodge, Emily Marshall, and Geoff Patterson	Gerrymandering and Convexity
2011	John Martin	The Helen of Geometry
2010	Andrew Barker	Evolutionary Stability in the Traveler's Dilemma
2010	Curtis Feist and Ramin Naimi	Topology Explains Why Automobile Sunshades Fold Oddly
2009	Lawrence Brenton	Remainder Wheels and Group Theory
2009	Greg N. Frederickson	Designing a Table Both Swinging and Stable
2008	Roland Minton and Timothy J. Pennings	Do Dogs Know Bifurcations?
2008	Andrew J. Simoson	Pursuit Curves for the Man in the Moone
2007	Richard Jerrard, Joel Schneider, Ralph Smallberg, and John Wetzel	Straw in a Box
2007	Allen Schwenk	Distortion of Average Class Size: The Lake Wobegon Effect
2006	Ezra Brown	Phoebe Floats!
2006	James Sandefur	A Geometric Series from Tennis
2005	Brian Hopkins and Robin J. Wilson	The Truth About Königsberg
2005	Stephen M. Walk	Mind Your ∃s and ∀s
2004	Greg N. Frederickson	A New Wrinkle on an Old Folding Problem
2003	David L. Finn	Can a Bicycle Create a Unicycle Track?
2003	Dan Kalman	An Underdetermined Linear System for GPS
2002	Tim Freeman	Conformality, the Exponential Function, and World Map Projections
2001	Ezra Brown	Three Fermat Trails to Elliptic Curves
2001	Chip Ross and Jody Sorensen	Will the Real Bifurcation Diagram Please Stand up!
2000	Martin Gardner	The Asymmetric Propeller
2000	Ezra Brown	Square Roots From 1; 24, 51, 10 to Dan Shanks
1999	David Bleecker and Larry Wallen	The World’s Biggest Taco
1999	Aaron Klebanoff and John Rickert	Studying the Cantor Dust at the Edge of Feigenbaum Diagrams
1998	Aimee Johnson and Kathleen Madden	Putting the Pieces Together: Understanding Robinson’s Nonperiodic Tilings
1998	Kevin Kirby	Of Memories, Neurons, and Rank-One Corrections
1997	Leon Harkleroad	How Mathematicians Know What Computers Can’t Do
1997	Chris Christensen and Shreeram S. Abhyankar	Newton’s Method for Resolving Affected Equations
1996	James G. Simmonds	A New Look at an Old Function, eiθ
1996	John Ewing	Can We See the Mandelbrot Set?
1995	Paulo Ribenboim	Prime Number Records
1995	Anthony P. Ferzola	Euler and Differentials
1994	Dan Kalman	Six Ways to Sum a Series
1994	Charles Groetsch	Inverse Problems and Torricelli’s Law
1993	Dana N. Mackenzie	Triquetras and Porisms
1993	Les Lange and James W. Miller	A Random Ladder Game: Permutations, Eigenvalues, and Convergence of Markov Chains
1992	Howard Eves	Two Surprising Theorems on Cavalieri Congruence
1992	William Dunham	Euler and the Fundamental Theorem of Algebra
1991	Mark F. Schilling	The Longest Run of Heads
1991	William B. Gearhart and Harris S. Shultz	The Function sin(x)/x
1990	Israel Kleiner	Evolution of the Function Concept: A Brief Survey
1990	D. Neidinger	Automatic Differentiation & APL
1989	Edward Rozema	Why Should We Pivot in Gaussian Elimination?
1989	Beverly L. Brechner and John C. Mayer	Antoine’s Necklace or How to Keep a Necklace from Falling Apart
1988	V. Frederick Rickey	Isaac Newton: Man, Myth, and Mathematics
1988	Dennis Luciano and Gordon Prichett	Cryptology: From Caesar Ciphers to Public-Key Cryptosystems
1987	Constance Reid	The Autobiography of Julia Robinson
1987	Irl Bivens	What a Tangent Line Is When It Isn’t a Limit
1986	Philip J. Davis	What Do I Know? A Study of Mathematical Self-Awareness
1985	Anthony Barcellos	The Fractal Geometry of Mandelbrot
1985	Kay Dundas	To Build a Better Box
1984	Ruma Falk and Maya Bar-Hillel	Probabilistic Dependence between Events
1984	Richard J. Trudeau	How Big is a Point?
1983	Warren Page and Vedula N. Murty	Nearness Relations among Measures of Central Tendency and Dispersion: Part 1
1983	Douglas R. Hofstadter	Analogies and Metaphors to Explain Gödel’s Theorem
1983	Paul R. Halmos	The Thrills of Abstraction
1982	Peter Renz	Mathematical Proof: What It Is and What It Ought to Be
1982	John Mitchem	On the History and Solution of the Four-Color Map Problem
1981	Ennis D. McCune, Robert G. Dean and William D. Clark	Calculators to Motivate Infinite Composition of Functions
1981	Don Chakerian	Circles and Spheres
1980	Hugh Ouellette and Gordon Bennett	The Discovery of a Generalization: An Example in Problem Solving
1980	Robert Nelson	Pictures, Probability and Paradox
1979	Richard Plagge	Fractions without Quotients: Arithmetic of Repeating Decimals
1979	Richard L. Francis	A Note on Angle Construction
1978	Frieda Zames	Surface Area and the Cylinder Area Paradox
1978	Allen H. Holmes, Walter J. Sanders and John W. LeDuc	Statistical Inference for the General Education Student-It Can Be Done
1977	Julian Weissglass	Small Groups: An Alternative to the Lecture Method
1977	Anneli Lax	Linear Algebra, a Potent Tool

== See also ==
- List of mathematics awards
