= Mathematics Magazine =

Collegiate mathematics journal

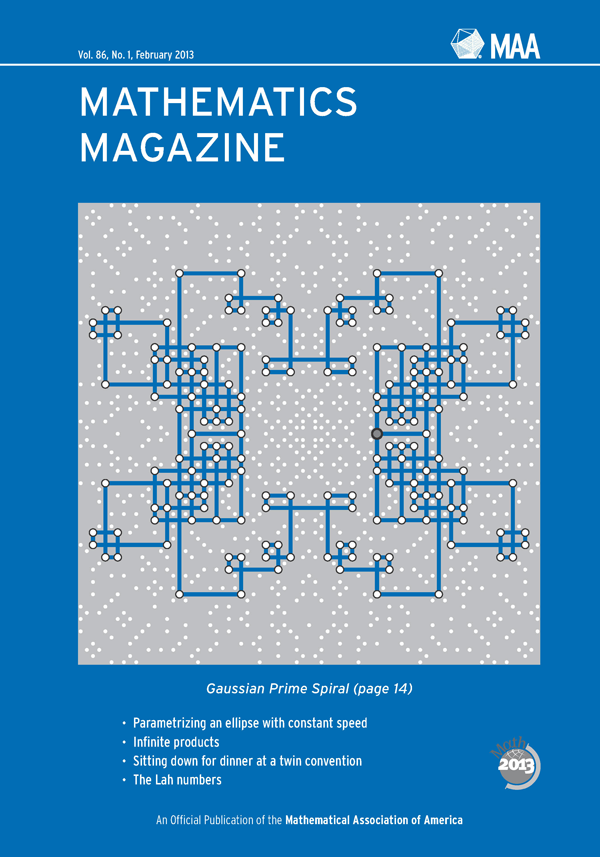
- Cover of February 2013 issue
- Editor: Michael A. Jones
- Categories: Mathematics
- Frequency: Bimonthly
- Paid circulation: 9,500
- Unpaid circulation: 500
- Total circulation: 10,000 (2008)
- Company: Taylor & Francis for the Mathematical Association of America
- Country: United States
- Based in: Washington, D.C.
- Language: English
- Website: https://maa.org/publication/mathematics-magazine/
- ISSN: 0025-570X

Mathematics Magazine is a refereed bimonthly publication of the Mathematical Association of America. Its intended audience is teachers of collegiate mathematics, especially at the junior/senior level, and their students. It is explicitly a journal of pedagogy rather than research. Rather than articles in the terse "theorem-proof" style of research journals, it seeks articles which provide a context for the mathematics they deliver, with examples, applications, illustrations, and historical background. Paid circulation in 2008 was 9,500 and total circulation was 10,000.

Mathematics Magazine is a continuation of Mathematics News Letter (1926–1934) and National Mathematics Magazine (1934–1945). Doris Schattschneider became the first female editor of Mathematics Magazine in 1981.

The MAA gives the Carl B. Allendoerfer Awards annually "for articles of expository excellence" published in Mathematics Magazine.

== See also ==
- American Mathematical Monthly
- Carl B. Allendoerfer Award
