= The Princeton Companion to Mathematics =

Mathematics reference book (2008)

- Editors: Timothy Gowers; June Barrow-Green; Imre Leader
- Language: English
- Subject: Mathematics
- Publisher: Princeton University Press
- Publication date: 2008
- Publication place: United States
- Pages: 1034
- Awards: Euler Book Prize
- ISBN: 978-0-691-11880-2
- Dewey Decimal: 510
- LC Class: QA11.2.P745 2008
- Website: press.princeton.edu/books/hardcover/9780691118802/the-princeton-companion-to-mathematics

The Princeton Companion to Mathematics is a book providing an extensive overview of mathematics that was published in 2008 by Princeton University Press. Edited by Timothy Gowers with associate editors June Barrow-Green and Imre Leader, it has been noted for the high caliber of its contributors. The book was the 2011 winner of the Euler Book Prize of the Mathematical Association of America, given annually to "an outstanding book about mathematics".

== Topics and organization ==
The book concentrates primarily on modern pure mathematics rather than applied mathematics, although it does also cover both applications of mathematics and the mathematics that relates to those applications; it provides a broad overview of the significant ideas and developments in research mathematics. It is organized into eight parts:

- An introduction to mathematics, outlining the major areas of study, key definitions, and the goals and purposes of mathematical research.
- An overview of the history of mathematics, in seven chapters including the development of important concepts such as number, geometry, mathematical proof, and the axiomatic approach to the foundations of mathematics. A chronology of significant events in mathematical history is also provided later in the book.
- Three core sections, totalling approximately 600 pages. The first of these sections provides an alphabetized set of articles on 99 specific mathematical concepts such as the axiom of choice, expander graphs, and Hilbert space. The second core section includes long surveys of 26 branches of research mathematics such as algebraic geometry and combinatorial group theory. The third describes 38 important mathematical problems and theorems such as the four color theorem, the Birch and Swinnerton-Dyer conjecture, and the Halting problem.
- A collection of biographies of nearly 100 famous deceased mathematicians, arranged chronologically, also including a history of Nicolas Bourbaki's pseudonymous collaboration.
- Essays describing the influences and applications of mathematics in the sciences, technology, business, medicine, and the fine arts.
- A section of perspectives on the future of mathematics, problem solving techniques, the ubiquity of mathematics, and advice to young mathematicians.

Despite its length, the range of topics included is selective rather than comprehensive: some important established topics such as diophantine approximation are omitted, transcendental number theory, differential geometry, and cohomology get short shrift, and the most recent frontiers of research are also generally not included.

== Target audience ==
The book's authors have attempted to keep their work accessible by forgoing abstraction and technical nomenclature as much as possible and by making heavy use of concrete examples and illustrations. Compared to the concise and factual coverage of mathematics in sources such as Wikipedia and MathWorld, the articles in the Princeton Companion are intended to be more reflective and discursive, and to convey the beauty and depth of modern mathematics. Quoting a passage from Bertrand Russell that "Pure Mathematics is the class of all propositions of the form p implies q", the editor of the Companion states that it "is about everything that Russell’s definition leaves out."

The core sections of the Companion are aimed primarily at readers who are already familiar with mathematics at the undergraduate level. Much of the rest of the book, such as its collection of biographies, would be accessible to a mathematically inclined high school student, and there is enough depth of coverage in the book to interest even professional research mathematicians. Reviewer Jonathan Borwein summarizes the audience for this book broadly:

Every research mathematician, every university student of mathematics, and every serious amateur of mathematical science should own at least one copy of the Companion.

== Contributors ==
The contributors to The Princeton Companion to Mathematics consist of 133 of the world's best mathematicians. Timothy Gowers, its editor, is the recipient of the Fields Medal, considered to be the top honor in mathematics. Other contributors include Fields medalists Michael Atiyah, Alain Connes, Charles Fefferman, and Terence Tao, and well-known mathematicians Noga Alon, George Andrews, Béla Bollobás, John P. Burgess, Kevin Buzzard, Clifford Cocks, Ingrid Daubechies, Persi Diaconis, Jordan Ellenberg, Oded Goldreich, Andrew Granville, Jeremy Gray, Frank Kelly, Sergiu Klainerman, Jon Kleinberg, János Kollár, Peter Lax, Dusa McDuff, Barry Mazur, Carl Pomerance, Eleanor Robson, Peter Sarnak, Madhu Sudan, Clifford Taubes, and Avi Wigderson. Among the historians who contributed to it are Charles C. Gillispie, Ivor Grattan-Guinness, Jeremy Gray, Niccolò Guicciardini, Ulf Hashagen, Eberhard Knobloch, Karen Hunger Parshall, Eleanor Robson, and Erhard Scholz.

== Awards ==
Gowers and the Princeton Companion were the 2011 winners of the Euler Book Prize of the Mathematical Association of America, given annually to "an outstanding book about mathematics".

The Princeton Companion was also listed as an outstanding title by Choice Magazine, a publication of the American Library Association, in 2009.

== See also ==
- The Princeton Companion to Applied Mathematics, published 2015 and edited by Nicholas Higham
