= Disquisitiones Arithmeticae =

1798 textbook by Carl Friedrich Gauss

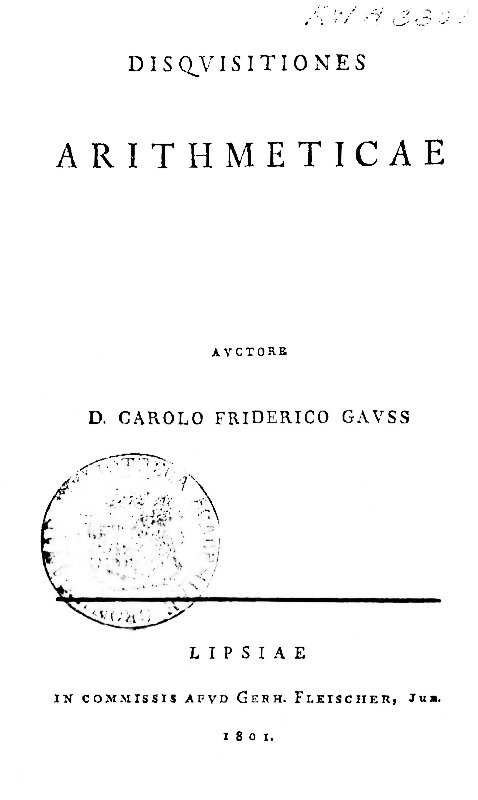
Title page of the first edition

Disquisitiones Arithmeticae (Latin for Arithmetical Investigations) is a textbook on number theory written in Latin by Carl Friedrich Gauss in 1798, when Gauss was 21, and published in 1801, when he was 24. It had a revolutionary impact on number theory by making the field truly rigorous and systematic and paved the path for modern number theory. In this book, Gauss brought together and reconciled results in number theory obtained by such eminent mathematicians as Fermat, Euler, Lagrange, and Legendre, while adding profound and original results of his own.

== Scope ==
The Disquisitiones covers both elementary number theory and parts of the area of mathematics now called algebraic number theory. Gauss did not explicitly recognize the concept of a group, which is central to modern algebra, so he did not use this term. His own title for his subject was Higher Arithmetic. In his Preface to the Disquisitiones, Gauss describes the scope of the book as follows:

The inquiries which this volume will investigate pertain to that part of Mathematics which concerns itself with integers.

Gauss also writes, "When confronting many difficult problems, derivations have been suppressed for the sake of brevity when readers refer to this work." ("Quod, in pluribus quaestionibus difficilibus, demonstrationibus syntheticis usus sum, analysinque per quam erutae sunt suppressi, imprimis brevitatis studio tribuendum est, cui quantum fieri poterat consulere oportebat.")

== Contents ==
The book is divided into seven sections:

1. Congruent Numbers in General
2. Congruences of the First Degree
3. Residues of Powers
4. Congruences of the Second Degree
5. Forms and Indeterminate Equations of the Second Degree
6. Various Applications of the Preceding Discussions
7. Equations Defining Sections of a Circle

These sections are subdivided into 366 numbered items, which state a theorem with proof or otherwise develop a remark or thought.

Sections I to III are essentially a review of previous results, including Fermat's little theorem, Wilson's theorem and the existence of primitive roots. Although few of the results in these sections are original, Gauss was the first mathematician to bring this material together in a systematic way. He also realized the importance of the property of unique factorization (assured by the fundamental theorem of arithmetic, first studied by Euclid), which he restates and proves using modern tools.

From Section IV onward, much of the work is original. Section IV develops a proof of quadratic reciprocity; Section V, which takes up over half of the book, is a comprehensive analysis of binary and ternary quadratic forms. Section VI includes two different primality tests. Finally, Section VII is an analysis of cyclotomic polynomials, which concludes by giving the criteria that determine which regular polygons are constructible, i.e., can be constructed with a compass and unmarked straightedge alone.

Gauss started to write an eighth section on higher-order congruences, but did not complete it, and it was published separately after his death with the title Disquisitiones generales de congruentiis (Latin: 'General Investigations on Congruences'). In it Gauss discussed congruences of arbitrary degree, attacking the problem of general congruences from a standpoint closely related to that taken later by Dedekind, Galois, and Emil Artin. The treatise paved the way for the theory of function fields over a finite field of constants. Ideas unique to that treatise are clear recognition of the importance of the Frobenius morphism, and a version of Hensel's lemma.

The Disquisitiones was one of the last mathematical works written in scholarly Latin. An English translation was not published until 1965, by Jesuit scholar Arthur A. Clarke. Clarke was the first dean at the Lincoln Center campus of Fordham College.

== Importance ==
Before the Disquisitiones was published, number theory consisted of a collection of isolated theorems and conjectures. Gauss brought the work of his predecessors together with his own original work into a systematic framework, filled in gaps, corrected unsound proofs, and extended the subject in numerous ways.

The logical structure of the Disquisitiones (theorem statement followed by proof, followed by corollaries) set a standard for later texts. While recognising the primary importance of logical proof, Gauss also illustrates many theorems with numerical examples.

The Disquisitiones was the starting point for other 19th-century European mathematicians, including Ernst Kummer, Peter Gustav Lejeune Dirichlet and Richard Dedekind. Many of Gauss's annotations are in effect announcements of further research of his own, some of which remained unpublished. They must have appeared particularly cryptic to his contemporaries; they can now be read as containing the germs of the theories of L-functions and complex multiplication, in particular.

The Disquisitiones continued to exert influence in the 20th century. For example, in section V, article 303, Gauss summarized his calculations of class numbers of proper primitive binary quadratic forms, and conjectured that he had found all of them with class numbers 1, 2, and 3. This was later interpreted as the determination of imaginary quadratic number fields with even discriminant and class number 1, 2, and 3, and extended to the case of odd discriminant. Sometimes called the class number problem, this more general question was eventually confirmed in 1986 (the specific question Gauss asked was confirmed by Landau in 1902 for class number one). In section VII, article 358, Gauss proved what can be interpreted as the first nontrivial case of the Riemann hypothesis for curves over finite fields (the Hasse–Weil theorem).

== Bibliography ==
- Gauss, Carl Friedrich (1801), Disquisitiones Arithmeticae (in Latin), Leipzig: Gerh. Fleischer
- Gauss, Carl Friedrich (1807) [1801], Recherches Arithmétiques (in French), translated by Poullet-Delisle, A.-C.-M., Paris: Courcier
- Gauss, Carl Friedrich (1889) [1801], Carl Friedrich Gauss' Untersuchungen über höhere Arithmetik (in German), translated by Maser, H., Berlin: Springer; Reprinted 1965, New York: Chelsea, ISBN 0-8284-0191-8
- Gauss, Carl Friedrich (1966) [1801], Groth, Paul; Bressi, Todd W. (eds.), Disquisitiones Arithmeticae (PDF), translated by Clarke, Arthur A., New Haven: Yale, doi:10.12987/9780300194258, ISBN 978-0-300-09473-2; Corrected ed. 1986, New York: Springer, doi:10.1007/978-1-4939-7560-0, ISBN 978-0-387-96254-2
- Dunnington, G. Waldo (1935), "Gauss, His Disquisitiones Arithmeticae, and His Contemporaries in the Institut de France", National Mathematics Magazine, 9 (7): 187–192, doi:10.2307/3028190, JSTOR 3028190
- Goldstein, Catherine; Schappacher, Norbert; Schwermer, Joachim (2010), The Shaping of Arithmetic after C.F. Gauss's Disquisitiones Arithmeticae, Springer, ISBN 978-3-642-05802-8
