= Klein's Encyclopedia of Mathematical Sciences =

Mathematical encyclopedia begun by Felix Klein

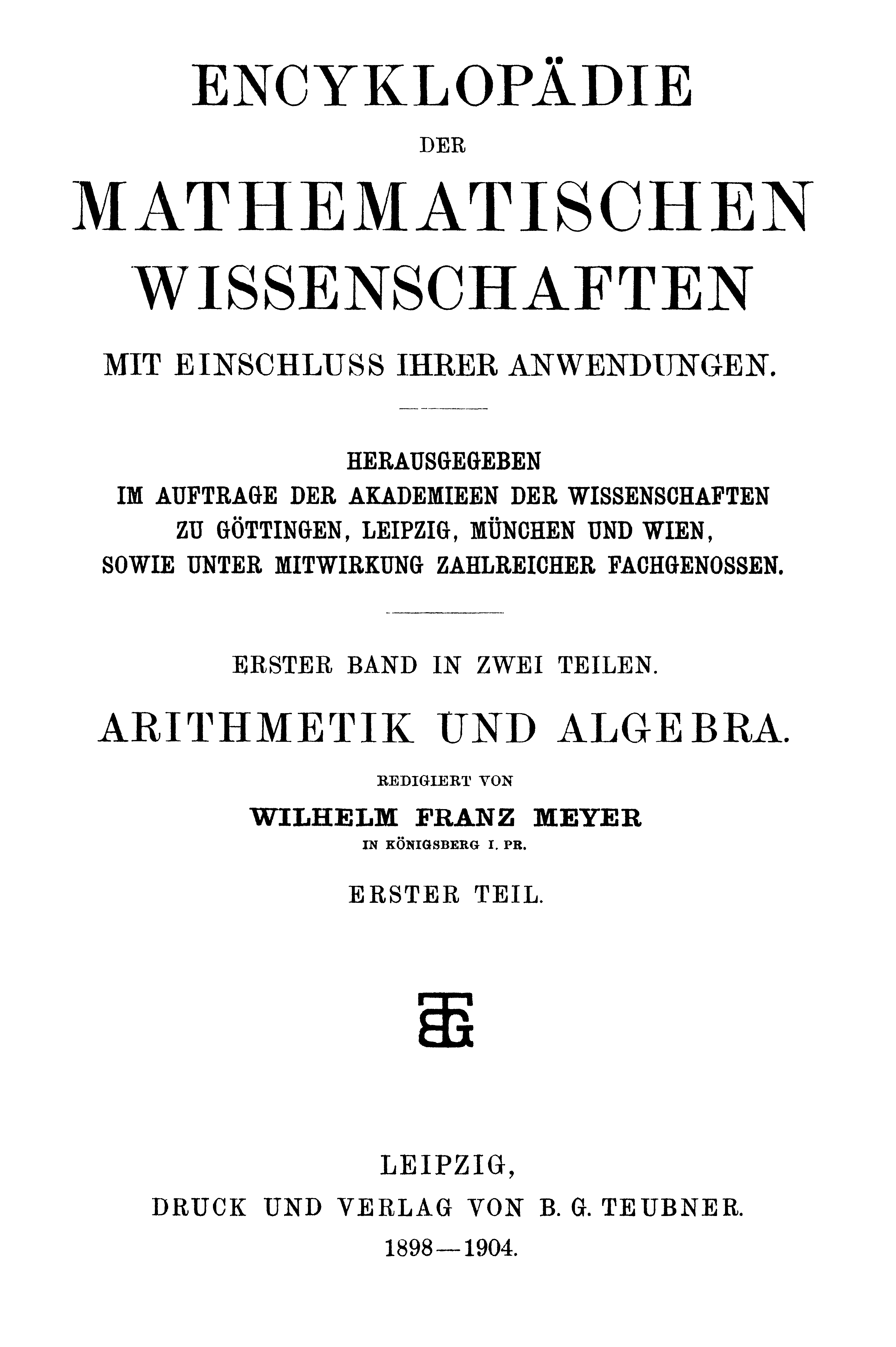
Title page of the periodical

Felix Klein's Encyclopedia of Mathematical Sciences is a German mathematical encyclopedia published in six volumes from 1898 to 1933. Klein and Wilhelm Franz Meyer were organizers of the encyclopedia. Its full title in English is Encyclopedia of Mathematical Sciences Including Their Applications, which is Encyklopädie der mathematischen Wissenschaften mit Einschluss ihrer Anwendungen (EMW). It is 20,000 pages in length (6 volumes, i.e. Bände, published in 23 separate books) and was published by B.G. Teubner Verlag, publisher of Mathematische Annalen.

Today, Göttinger Digitalisierungszentrum provides online access to all volumes, while archive.org hosts some particular parts.

== Overview ==
Walther von Dyck acted as chairman of the commission to publish the encyclopedia. In 1904 he contributed a preparatory report on the publication venture in which the mission statement is given.

The mission was to present a simple and concise exposition, as complete as possible, of the body of contemporary mathematics and its consequences, while indicating with a detailed bibliography the historical development of mathematical methods from the beginning of the nineteenth century.

The preparatory report (Einleitender Bericht) serves as the Preface for the EMW. In 1908 von Dyck reported on the project to the International Congress of Mathematicians in Rome.

Nominally, Wilhelm Franz Meyer was the founder president of the project and assembled volume (Band) 1 (in 2 separate books), "Arithmetic and Algebra", that appeared between 1898 and 1904. D. Selivanov expanded his 20-page article on finite differences in Volume 1, Part 2 into a 92-page monograph published under the title Lehrbuch der Differenzenrechnung.

Volume 2 (in 5 separate books), the "Analysis" series printed between 1900 and 1927 had coeditors Wilhelm Wirtinger and Heinrich Burkhardt. Burkhardt condensed his extensive historical review of mathematical analysis that appeared in the Jahresbericht of the German Mathematical Society for a shorter contribution to the EMW.

Volume 3 (in 6 separate books) on geometry was edited by Wilhelm Franz Meyer. These articles were published between 1906 and 1932 with the book Differentialgeometrie published in 1927 and the book Spezielle algebraische Flächen in 1932. Significantly, Corrado Segre contributed an article on "Higher-dimensional space" in 1912 that he updated in 1920. The latter was reviewed by T.R. Hollcroft.

Volume 4 (in 4 separate books) of EMW concerned mechanics, and was edited by Felix Klein and Conrad Müller. Arnold Sommerfeld edited volume 5 (in 3 separate books) on "Physics", a series that ran until 1927.

Volume 6 consisted of two sections (the geodesy section in 1 book and the astronomy section in 2 separate books): Philipp Furtwängler and E. Weichart coedited "Geodesy and Geophysics", which ran from 1905 to 1922. Karl Schwarzschild and Samuel Oppenheim coedited "Astronomy", publishing until 1933.

== Mentions ==
In 1905, Alfred Bucherer acknowledged the influence of the encyclopedia on vector notation in the second edition of his book:

When I wrote the first edition of this small work, the discussions and deliberations concerning a uniform symbolism for vector analysis were still in flux. Since that time through the adoption of a suitable method of designation by those working on the Encyklopädie an important system of symbolism has been put forward.

In 1916, George Abram Miller noted:

One of the great advantages of this large encyclopedia is that it tends to avoid duplication by establishing a higher minimum of general mathematical knowledge. ... The vastness of the new [mathematical] literature, combined with the fact that some of the new developments appeared first in somewhat obscure places, has often made it difficult for an author to determine whether his results were new. While some of this difficulty remains, yet the large encyclopedia, in which related important results are carefully associated, tends to reduce the difficulty materially.

in 1922, with the publication of a volume including articles by Charles Osgood on analytic functions and functions of several complex variables, and other topics, a notice was published by the Bulletin of the American Mathematical Society.

In his review of the Encyclopedic Dictionary of Mathematics, Jean Dieudonné raised the specter of Klein's encyclopedia while denigrating its orientation to applied mathematics and historical documentation:

A tremendous gain of space has been achieved by eliminating much of the discursiveness of the old Encyklopädie; the great majority of its historical information (which would have been a mere duplication); a large amount of results of secondary importance which needlessly cluttered many articles; and finally, all the parts devoted to astronomy, geodesy, mechanics, and physics which had no significant mathematical content. It has thus been possible to compress into about one-tenth of the bulk of the Encyklopädie a more valuable amount of information on a science which certainly at present is ten times more extensive than it was in 1900.

Librarian Barbara Kirsch Schaefer wrote:

Despite its age it remains a valuable source of reference, for its period of publication spans one of the most fruitful periods of mathematical research. Noted for its comprehensive treatment and well-documented scholarly articles, it is aimed at the specialist.

In 1982. a history of aeronautics noted the following:

As organizer and editor of the monumental Encyclopedia of Mathematical Sciences Including Their Applications, [Klein] compiled a collection of definitive studies that became the standard reference in mathematical physics. Early in the thirty-year enterprise Klein solicited the esteemed Sebastian Finsterwalder, professor of mathematics at the Munich polytechnic (and incidentally, one of Prandtl's teachers), to write an essay on aerodynamics. This review article is significant in the history of aerodynamics because of its comprehensive scope and because it was submitted in August 1902. The date is more than a year before the Wrights achieved their powered flights at Kitty Hawk, North Carolina, and two years before Prandtl introduced his theory of the boundary layer. It is therefore kind of a prenatal record of the science we now call aerodynamics. More to the point, however, it was then a rare compendious account of the state of the art of aerodynamics, a first reference to be found in much subsequent research in the field. Klein's encyclopedia as a whole, moreover, provided the model for the later publication of Aerodynamic Theory, the six-volume encyclopedia of the science of flight that William F. Durand edited in the mid-1930s...

Ivor Grattan-Guinness observed in 2009:

Many of the articles were the first of their kind on their topic, and several are still the last or the best. Some of them have excellent information on the deeper historical background. This is especially true of articles on applied mathematics, including engineering, which was stressed in its title.

He also wrote, "The mathematicians at Berlin, the other main mathematical pole in Germany and a citadel for pure mathematics, were not invited to collaborate on the EMW and are reputed to have sneered at it."

In 2013, Umberto Bottazzini and Jeremy Gray published Hidden Harmony in which they examined the history of complex analysis. In the final chapter concerned with textbooks, they used Klein's and Molk's encyclopedia projects to contrast the approaches in Germany (Weierstrass and Riemann) and France (Cauchy). In 1900 an element of an algebra over a field (usually $\mathbb{R}$ or $\mathbb{C}$) was known as a hypercomplex number, exemplified by quaternions ($\mathbb{H}$) which contributed the dot product and cross product useful in analytic geometry, and the del operator in analysis. Explorative articles on hypercomplex numbers, mentioned by Bottazzini and Gray, written by Eduard Study (1898) and Elie Cartan (1908), served as advertisements to twentieth century algebraists, and they soon retired the term hypercomplex by displaying the structure of algebras.

== French edition ==
Jules Molk was the editor-in-chief of the Encyclopédie des sciences mathématiques pures et appliquées, the French edition of Klein's encyclopedia. It is a French translation and re-writing published between 1904 and 1916 by Gauthier-Villars (partly in cooperation with B. G. Teubner Verlag). According to Jeanne Peiffer, the "French edition is notable because the historical treatment is more extensive, and often more precise (thanks to the collaboration of Tannery and Eneström) than the original German version."
