= Joachim Schwermer =

German mathematician

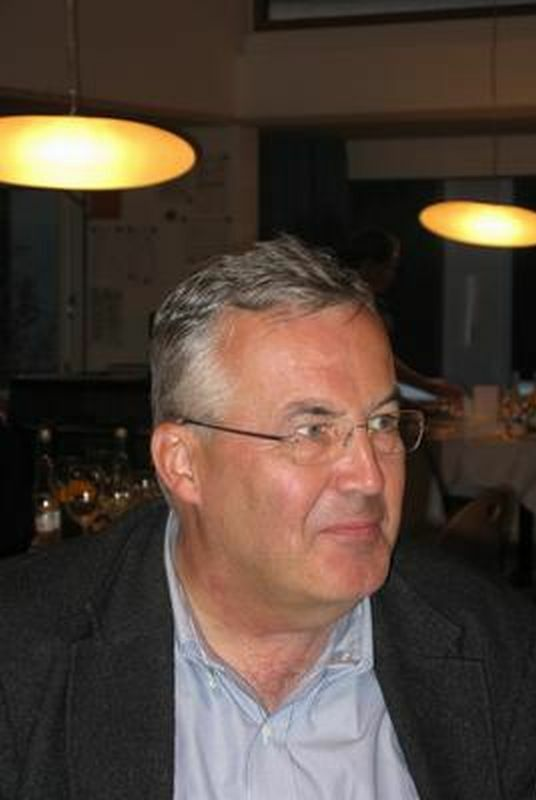
Schwermer at Oberwolfach, 2010

Joachim Schwermer (26 May 1950, Kulmbach) is a German mathematician, specializing in number theory.

== Education ==
Schwermer received his Abitur in 1969 at Aloisiuskolleg in Bad Godesberg and then studied mathematics at the University of Bonn. After graduating in 1974 with his Diplom, he received in 1977 his Promotion (Ph.D.) under Günter Harder with thesis Eisensteinreihen und die Kohomologie von Kongruenzuntergruppen von $SL_n(\mathbb{Z})$. In 1982 he received his Habilitation from the University of Bonn.

== Career ==
From 1986 he was a professor at the Catholic University of Eichstätt-Ingolstadt, then at the University of Düsseldorf, and finally in the 2000s at the University of Vienna. During the academic year 1980–1981 Schwermer was a visiting scholar at the Institute for Advanced Study. He is the scientific director at the Erwin Schrödinger International Institute for Mathematical Physics.

== Research ==
Schwermer's research deals with algebraic groups in number theory, arithmetic geometry, Lie groups, and L-functions. He has written essays on the history of mathematics, for example, about Helmut Hasse, Hermann Minkowski, and Emil Artin.

== Awards and honors ==
In 1987 he was awarded the Gay-Lussac-Humboldt-Prize.

== Selected publications ==
- with Della Dumbaugh, Emil Artin and Beyond – Class Field Theory and L-Functions, Heritage of European Mathematics, European Mathematical Society, 2015, ISBN 978-3037191460
- with Jens Carsten Jantzen: Algebra, Springer, 2006, ISBN 3540213805, doi:10.1007/3-540-29287-X
- Kohomologie arithmetisch definierter Gruppen und Eisensteinreihen, Springer, Lectures Notes in Mathematics Bd.988, 1983, ISBN 9783540122920, doi:10.1007/BFb0070268
- as editor with Jean-Pierre Labesse: Cohomology of arithmetic groups and automorphic forms, Springer, 1990, Lecture Notes in Mathematics (Konferenz Luminy/Marseille 1989), doi:10.1007/BFb0085723
- as editor with Catherine Goldstein and Norbert Schappacher: The Shaping of Arithmetic after C. F. Gauss's Disquisitiones Arithmeticae, Springer 2007. ISBN 978-3-540-20441-1 (containing Schwermer's essay Reduction theory of quadratic forms: towards räumliche Anschauung in Minkowski's Early Work , doi:10.1007/978-3-540-34720-0_18, and his essay, with Della Fenster, Composition of Quadratic Forms: An Algebraic Perspective, doi:10.1007/978-3-540-34720-0_5)
- Minkowski, Hensel, and Hasse: On The Beginnings of the Local-Global Principle, in Jeremy Gray, Karen Parshall: Episodes in the history of modern algebra (1800-1950), American Mathematical Society 2007
- Über Reziprozitätsgesetze in der Zahlentheorie, in Horst Knörrer (ed.): Arithmetik und Geometrie, Mathematische Miniaturen, vol. 3, Birkhäuser Verlag 1986, ISBN 3-7643-1759-0, doi:10.1007/978-3-0348-5226-5_2
