= Ernst Witt =

German mathematician (1911–1991)

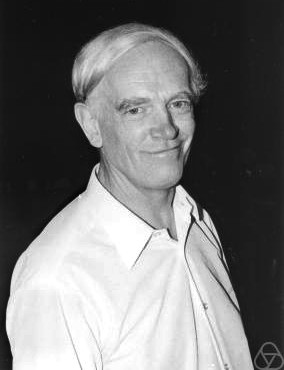
- Ernst Witt in Nice, 1970
- Born: 26 June 1911; Alsen, German Empire (present-day Denmark)
- Died: 3 July 1991 (aged 80); Hamburg, Germany
- Education: University of Göttingen
- Known for: Witt algebra Witt group Witt's theorem Witt vector Bourbaki–Witt theorem Hasse–Witt matrix Poincaré–Birkhoff–Witt theorem
- Scientific career
- Fields: Mathematics
- Institutions: University of Hamburg
- Doctoral advisor: Emmy Noether
- Doctoral students: Walter Borho; Günter Harder; Ina Kersten

Ernst Witt (26 June 1911 – 3 July 1991) was a German mathematician, one of the leading algebraists of his time.

== Biography ==
Witt was born on the island of Alsen, then a part of the German Empire. Shortly after his birth, his parents moved the family to China to work as missionaries, and he did not return to Europe until he was nine.

After his schooling, Witt went to the University of Freiburg and the University of Göttingen. He joined the NSDAP (Nazi Party) and was an active party member. Witt was awarded a Ph.D. at the University of Göttingen in 1933 with a thesis titled: "Riemann-Roch theorem and zeta-Function in hypercomplexes" (Riemann-Rochscher Satz und Zeta-Funktion im Hyperkomplexen) that was supervised by Gustav Herglotz, with Emmy Noether suggesting the topic for the doctorate. He became a qualified lecturer and gave guest lectures in Göttingen and Hamburg. He was also associated with the team led by Helmut Hasse who led his habilitation. In June 1936, he gave his habilitation lecture.

During World War II he joined a group of five mathematicians, recruited by Wilhelm Fenner, and which included Georg Aumann, Alexander Aigner, Oswald Teichmüller, Johann Friedrich Schultze and their leader professor Wolfgang Franz, to form the backbone of the new mathematical research department in the late 1930s that would eventually be called: Section IVc of Cipher Department of the High Command of the Wehrmacht (abbr. OKW/Chi).

From 1937 until 1979, he taught at the University of Hamburg. He died in Hamburg in 1991, shortly after his 80th birthday.

== Work ==
Witt's work has been highly influential. His invention of the Witt vectors clarifies and generalizes the structure of the p-adic numbers. It has become fundamental to p-adic Hodge theory.

Witt was the founder of the theory of quadratic forms over an arbitrary field. He proved several of the key results, including the Witt cancellation theorem. He defined the Witt ring of all quadratic forms over a field, now a central object in the theory.

The Poincaré–Birkhoff–Witt theorem is basic to the study of Lie algebras. In algebraic geometry, the Hasse–Witt matrix of an algebraic curve over a finite field determines the cyclic étale coverings of degree p of a curve in characteristic p.

In the 1970s, Witt claimed that in 1940 he had discovered what would eventually be named the "Leech lattice" many years before John Leech discovered it in 1965, but Witt did not publish his discovery and the details of exactly what he did are unclear.

== See also ==
- Leech lattice
- Verschiebung operator
- Wedderburn's little theorem
- List of things named after Ernst Witt

== Bibliography ==
- Schappacher, Norbert; Scholz, Erhard (1996). "How to Write about Teichmüller". Mathematical Intelligencer. 18 (1): 5–6. doi:10.1007/BF03024810. S2CID 189882910.
- Witt, Ernst (1998), Kersten, Ina (ed.), Collected papers. Gesammelte Abhandlungen, Berlin, New York: Springer-Verlag, ISBN 978-3-540-57061-5, MR 1643949
