= Wilhelm Franz Meyer =

German mathematician (1856–1934)

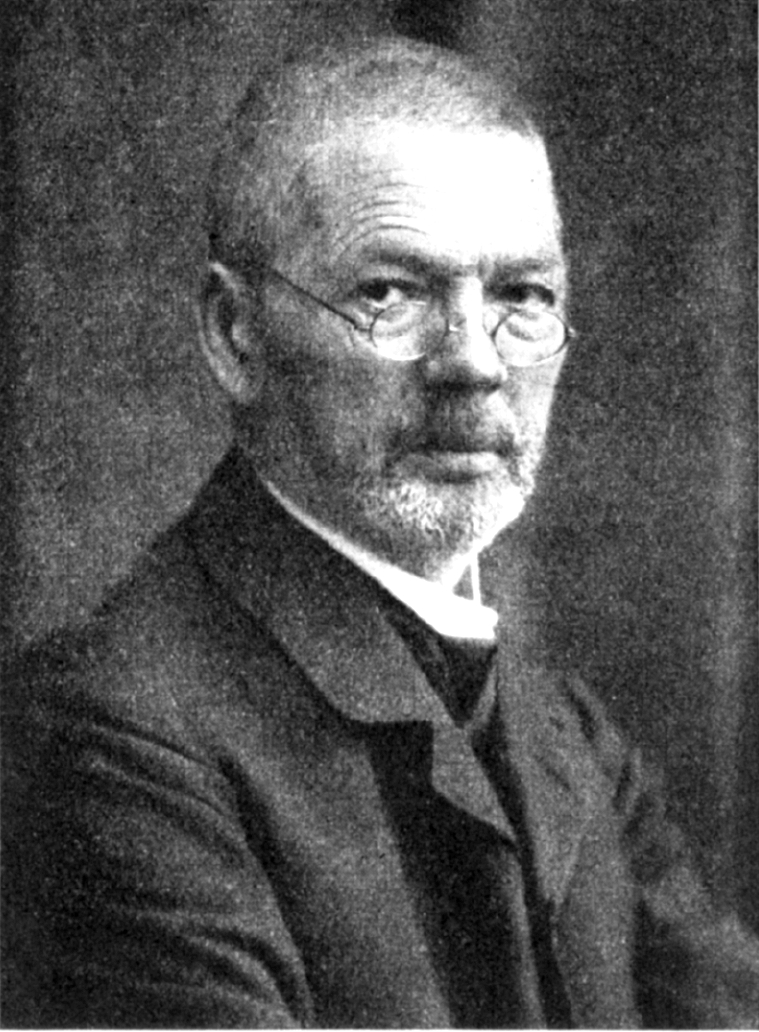
- Born: 2 September 1856; Magdeburg, German Confederation
- Died: 11 June 1934 (aged 77); Königsberg, Germany (now Kaliningrad, Russia)
- Education: Leipzig University; Ludwig-Maximilians-Universität München
- Scientific career
- Fields: Mathematics
- Workplaces: University of Tübingen; Bergakademie of Clausthal; University of Königsberg
- Thesis: Anwendungen der Topologie auf die Gestalten der algebraischen Curven, speciell der rationalen Curven 4. und 5. Ordnung (1878)

Friedrich Wilhelm Franz Meyer (1856–1934) was a German mathematician and one of the main editors of the Encyclopädie der Mathematischen Wissenschaften.

== Life and work ==
Meyer studied at Leipzig University and the Ludwig-Maximilians-Universität München. In 1878, he was awarded a doctorate by Munich. He studied further in Berlin under Weierstrass, Kummer and Kronecker. In 1880, he got the venia legendi at the University of Tübingen. In 1888, he became a full professor at the Bergakademie of Clausthal (today Clausthal University of Technology). From October 1897 until October 1924, when he retired, he taught at the University of Königsberg.

The wide research work of Meyer (more than 130 papers) is centred basically on geometry and, specifically, on invariant theory.

Notwithstanding he is mainly known for he was one of the main editors of the Encyklopädie der mathematischen Wissenschaften published from 1898 to 1933 in 23 separate books. Meyer was directly in charge to edit the geometry volumes.

== Bibliography ==
- de Siqueira, Rogerio Monteiro (2015). "Editing geometries: The geometry volumes in Klein's encyclopedia". Circumscribere. 15: 35–47. ISSN 1980-7651.
- Gray, Jeremy (2008). Plato's Ghost: The Modernist Transformation of Mathematics. Princeton University Press. ISBN 978-0-691-13610-3.
- Parshall, Karen V. H. (1990). "The one-hundredth anniversary of the death of invariant theory?". The Mathematical Intelligencer. 12 (4): 10–16. doi:10.1007/BF03024027. ISSN 0343-6993. S2CID 117771242.
