= John Fauvel =

British historian of mathematics

- Born: 21 July 1947; Scotland
- Died: 12 May 2001 (aged 53)
- Citizenship: United Kingdom
- Education: University of Essex; University of Warwick
- Known for: President of the British Society for the History of Mathematics
- Scientific career
- Fields: Mathematics; History of mathematics
- Workplaces: Open University
- Thesis: Fuzzy Theory (1976)
- Doctoral advisor: David Orme Tall

John Fauvel (21 July 1947 – 12 May 2001) was a British mathematician and historian of mathematics.

== Education ==
Fauvel was from Scotland, where his father was a principal. Ian Blair was a cousin.

John attended Trinity College, Glenalmond. He then studied mathematics at the University of Essex, where he graduated in 1970, and at the University of Warwick, where he obtained his master's degree in 1973. In 1977, he obtained his MPhil from the University of Warwick under the supervision of David Orme Tall, with a thesis entitled Fuzzy Theory.

== Career ==
From 1974, Fauvel worked at the Open University. From 1991 to 1994, he was President of the British Society for the History of Mathematics and he also edited its newsletter. From 1992 to 1996, he directed an international study group on the relations between history and mathematics pedagogy, which is affiliated with the International Commission for Mathematical Education (ICMI), and in 2000 he co-directed a major study of ICMI. In 1998, he was invited lecturer by the New Zealand Mathematical Society. Fauvel was a visiting scholar in the Mathematics Department at Colorado College on several occasions, including one on a Fulbright Fellowship during the Winter and Spring of 1999.

Fauvel died on 12 May 2001 of complications from liver disease.

== Publications ==
Fauvel is known as an editor of books on the history of mathematics, several of which have been translated.

- Fauvel, John; Flood, Raymond; Wilson, Robin, eds. (2003). Music and Mathematics: From Pythagoras to Fractals. Oxford University Press. ISBN 0-19-851187-6. Fauvel, John; Flood, Raymond; Wilson, Robin J. (2006). 2006 2nd edition. Oxford University Press. ISBN 0-19-929893-9.
- Fauvel, John; Flood, Raymond; Wilson, Robin, eds. (2000). Oxford Figures: 800 Years of the Mathematical Sciences. Oxford University Press. ISBN 0-19-852309-2. 2013 2nd edition. ISBN 9780199681976.
- Fauvel, John; Flood, Raymond; Wilson, Robin, eds. (1993). Möbius and his band: Mathematics and astronomy in nineteenth-century Germany. Oxford University Press. ISBN 019853969X.
- Fauvel, John; Flood, Raymond; Shortland, Michael; Wilson, Robin, eds. (1988). Let Newton be!. Oxford University Press. ISBN 0-19-853924-X.
- Edited with Jeremy Gray: The history of mathematics: A reader. Macmillan, 1987; 1997 pbk edition. Mathematical Association of America. 16 March 1987. ISBN 0333427912.
- Edited with Bengt Johansson, Frank Swetz, Otto Bekken, and Victor J. Katz: Learn from the Masters. MAA, 1994. Swetz, Frank (1995). 1995 pbk edition. Cambridge University Press. ISBN 0-88385-703-0.
- Fauvel, John (December 1992). "Remembering Charles Babbage (1791–1871)". Interdisciplinary Science Reviews. 17 (4): 304–308. Bibcode:1992ISRv...17..304F. doi:10.1179/ISR.1992.17.4.304.
- Fauvel, J. (1990). Mathematics through history: a resource guide. York: QED Books. ISBN 0946544719; 47 pages
- Chant, Colin; Fauvel, John, eds. (1980). Darwin to Einstein: historical studies on science and belief. Longman. ISBN 0582491576.
