= Hirst Prize and Lectureship =

- Awarded for: Original and innovative work in the history of mathematics, which may be in any medium.
- Location: London, UK
- Country: United Kingdom
- Presented by: Jointly awarded by the London Mathematical Society (LMS) and the British Society for the History of Mathematics (BSHM)
- Eligibility: Any mathematician or historian of mathematics.
- Status: Active
- Website: www.lms.ac.uk/prizes/hirstprize

The Hirst Prize and Lectureship is a biennial prize, jointly awarded by the London Mathematical Society (LMS) and the British Society for the History of Mathematics (BSHM). The prize recognises original and innovative contributions to the history of mathematics by an individual winner or by joint winners.

The prize was first awarded in 2015 (solely by the LMS) as part of the LMS's 150th anniversary celebrations. The prize is named in honour of Thomas Archer Hirst, who was from 1872 to 1874 the fifth President of the LMS. Any mathematician or historian of mathematics is eligible for the prize — except for previous winners of the De Morgan Medal, LMS's Pólya Prize, Fröhlich Prize, Naylor Prize and Lectureship, Senior Whitehead Prize, Senior Anne Bennett Prize, or the Christopher Zeeman Medal. In the year for awarding the prize, the members of the Hirst Prize Committee, the members of the LMS and BSHM Councils are also ineligible.

The administration of the Hirst Prize alternates between the LMS and the BSHM offices, but the LMS alone organises the Hirst Lectureship. The lecture normally takes place in the year following the award of the Hirst Prize, and the venue for the lecture is chosen by the winner (or winners) of the Hirst Prize.

== Recipients ==
- 2015: Edmund F. Robertson and John Joseph O'Connor (joint winners)
  - 2016 lecture: History of Mathematics: Some Personal Thoughts
- 2018: Jeremy Gray
  - 2019 lecture: Jesse Douglas, Minimal Surfaces, and the first Fields Medal
- 2021: Karine Chemla
  - 2022 lecture: Algebraic work with operations in China, 1st century—13th century
- 2023: Erhard Scholz
  - 2024 lecture: From Grassmann complements to Hodge duality
- 2025: June Barrow-Green
  - 2026 lecture: George Birkhoff: 'The Poincaré of America'
