= Della Dumbaugh =

American mathematician and historian of mathematics

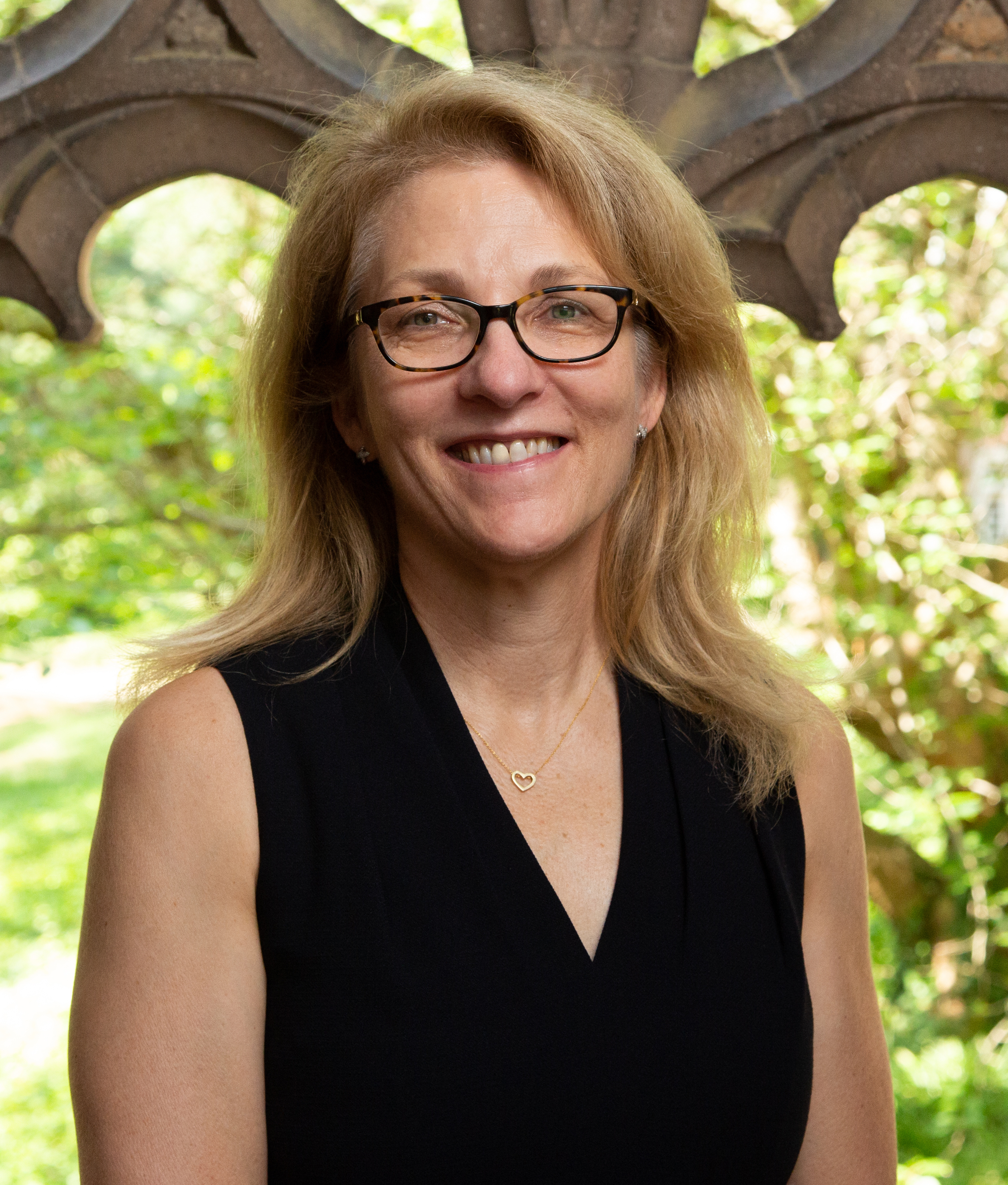
At the University of Richmond in 2020.

Della Jeanne Dumbaugh (also published as Della Dumbaugh Fenster) is an American mathematician and historian of mathematics, focusing on the history of algebra and number theory. She is a professor of mathematics at the University of Richmond.

== Education and career ==
Dumbaugh is originally from Louisville, Kentucky. She joined the University of Richmond faculty after completing her Ph.D. in 1994 at the University of Virginia. Her dissertation, Leonard Eugene Dickson and His Work in the Theory of Algebra, concerned the work of Leonard Eugene Dickson (1874–1954), one of the first American mathematicians to work in abstract algebra. It was supervised by Karen Parshall.

== Contributions ==
With Joachim Schwermer, Dumbaugh is a coauthor of the book Emil Artin and Beyond – Class Field Theory and L-Functions (Heritage of European Mathematics, European Mathematical Society, 2015), concerning the work of Emil Artin and others on class field theory and L-functions. She is the co-editor of A Century of Advancing Mathematics celebrating the centennial of the Mathematical Association of America (Mathematical Association of America, 2015) and, with Deanna Haunsperger, of the book Count Me In: Community and Belonging in Mathematics on diversity in mathematics (American Mathematical Society and Mathematical Association of America, 2022).

Dumbaugh was named editor-in-chief of The American Mathematical Monthly, beginning in January 2022. In 2025, Vadim Ponomarenko was announced as editor-elect, succeeding her.

== Recognition ==
Dumbaugh was the 2019 winner of the John M. Smith Award for Distinguished College or University Teaching of the Mathematical Association of America.
