= Selivanov =

Selivanov (masculine, Russian: Селиванов) or Selivanova (feminine, Russian: Селиванова) is a Russian surname. Notable people with the surname include:

- Alexander Selivanov (born 1971), Russian ice hockey player
- Alexey Selivanov (1900–1949), Soviet general
- Andrey Selivanov (1847–1917), Russian politician
- Andrey Selivanov (chess player) (born 1967), Russian chess player
- Dmitry Selivanov (1964–1989), Russian guitarist and singer
- Dmitry Fyodorovich Selivanov (1855–1932), Russian mathematician
- Kondraty Selivanov (1730/40–1832), Russian leader of the Skoptsy
- Pāvels Seļivanovs (born 1952), Latvian volleyball player
- Volodymyr Selivanov (born 1945), Ukrainian jurist, politician, and researcher
