= Poincaré and the Three-Body Problem =

Monograph in the history of mathematics

- Author: June Barrow-Green
- Language: English
- Genre: Non-fiction
- Publisher: American Mathematical Society, London Mathematical Society
- Publication date: 1997

Poincaré and the Three-Body Problem is a monograph in the history of mathematics on the work of Henri Poincaré on the three-body problem in celestial mechanics. It was written by June Barrow-Green, as a revision of her 1993 doctoral dissertation, and published in 1997 by the American Mathematical Society and London Mathematical Society as Volume 11 in their shared History of Mathematics series (ISBN 0-8218-0367-0). The Basic Library List Committee of the Mathematical Association of America has suggested its inclusion in undergraduate mathematics libraries.

== Topics ==
The three-body problem concerns the motion of three bodies interacting under Newton's law of universal gravitation, and the existence of orbits for those three bodies that remain stable over long periods of time. This problem has been of great interest mathematically since Newton's formulation of the laws of gravity, in particular with respect to the joint motion of the sun, earth, and moon. The centerpiece of Poincaré and the Three-Body Problem is a memoir on this problem by Henri Poincaré, entitled Sur le problème des trois corps et les équations de la dynamique [On the problem of the three bodies and the equations of dynamics]. This memo won the King Oscar Prize in 1889, commemorating the 60th birthday of Oscar II of Sweden, and was scheduled to be published in Acta Mathematica on the king's birthday, until Lars Edvard Phragmén and Poincaré determined that there were serious errors in the paper. Poincaré called for the paper to be withdrawn, spending more than the prize money to do so. In 1890 it was finally published in revised form, and over the next ten years Poincaré expanded it into a monograph, Les méthodes nouvelles de la mécanique céleste [New methods in celestial mechanics]. Poincare's work led to the discovery of chaos theory, set up a long-running separation between mathematicians and dynamical astronomers over the convergence of series, and became the initial claim to fame for Poincaré himself. The detailed story behind these events, long forgotten, was brought back to life in a sequence of publications by multiple authors in the early and mid 1990s, including Barrow-Green's dissertation, a journal publication based on the dissertation, and this book.

The first chapter of Poincaré and the Three-Body Problem introduces the problem and its second chapter surveys early work on this problem, in which some particular solutions were found by Newton, Jacob Bernoulli, Daniel Bernoulli, Leonhard Euler, Joseph-Louis Lagrange, Pierre-Simon Laplace, Alexis Clairaut, Charles-Eugène Delaunay, Hugo Glydén, Anders Lindstedt, George William Hill, and others. The third chapter surveys the early work of Poincaré, which includes work on differential equations, series expansions, and some special solutions of the three-body problem, and the fourth chapter surveys this history of the founding of Acta Arithmetica by Gösta Mittag-Leffler and of the prize competition announced by Mittag-Leffler in 1885, which Barrow-Green suggests may have been deliberately set with Poincaré's interests in mind and which Poincaré's memoir would win. The fifth chapter concerns Poincaré's memoir itself; it includes a detailed comparison of the significant differences between the withdrawn and published versions, and overviews the new mathematical content it contained, including not only the possibility of chaotic orbits but also homoclinic orbits and the use of integrals to construct invariants of systems. After a chapter on Poincaré's expanded monograph and his other later work on the three-body problem, the remainder of the book discusses the influence of Poincaré's work on later mathematicians. This includes contributions on the singularities of solutions by Paul Painlevé, Edvard Hugo von Zeipel, Tullio Levi-Civita, Jean Chazy, Richard McGehee, Donald G. Saari, and Zhihong Xia, on the stability of solutions by Aleksandr Lyapunov, on numerical results by George Darwin, Forest Ray Moulton, and Bengt Strömgren, on power series by Giulio Bisconcini and Karl F. Sundman, and on the KAM theory by Andrey Kolmogorov, Vladimir Arnold, and Jürgen Moser, and additional contributions by George David Birkhoff, Jacques Hadamard, V. K. Melnikov, and Marston Morse. However, much of modern chaos theory is left out of the story "as amply dealt with elsewhere", and the work of Qiudong Wang generalizing Sundman's convergent series from three bodies to arbitrary numbers of bodies is also omitted. An epilogue considers the impact of modern computer power on the numerical study of Poincaré's theories.

== Audience and reception ==
This book is aimed at specialists in the history of mathematics, but can be read by any student of mathematics familiar with differential equations, although the central part of the book, analyzing Poincaré's work, may be too light on mathematical detail to be readily understandable without reference to other material.

Reviewer Ll. G. Chambers writes "This is a superb piece of work and it throws new light on one of the most fundamental topics of mechanics." Reviewer Jean Mawhin calls it "the definitive work about the chaotic story of the King Oscar Prize" and "pleasantly accessible"; reviewer R. Duda calls it "clearly organized, well written, richly documented", and both Mawhin and Duda call it a "valuable addition" to the literature. And reviewer Albert C. Lewis writes that it "provides insights into higher mathematics that justify its being on every university mathematics student's reading list". Although reviewer Florin Diacu (himself a noted researcher on the n-body problem) complains that Wang was omitted, that Barrow-Green "sometimes fails to see connections ... within Poincaré's own work" and that some of her translations are inaccurate, he also recommends the book.
