= Albert Leon Whiteman Memorial Prize =

- Awarded for: Notable exposition on the history of mathematics.
- Country: United States
- Presented by: American Mathematical Society (AMS)
- Reward: US $5,000
- First award: 2001
- Final award: 2021
- Website: www.ams.org/prizes/whiteman-prize.html

The Albert Leon Whiteman Memorial Prize is awarded by the American Mathematical Society for notable exposition and exceptional scholarship in the history of mathematics.

The prize was endowed in 1998 with funds provided by Sally Whiteman in memory of her late husband Albert Leon Whiteman. Originally it was awarded every 4 years with the first prized handed out in 2001. Since 2009 the prize is awarded every 3 years and carries a prize money of $5000.

== Past recipients ==
- 2001 Thomas Hawkins
- 2005 Harold M. Edwards
- 2009 Jeremy Gray
- 2012 Joseph Dauben
- 2015 Umberto Bottazzini
- 2018 Karen Parshall
- 2021 Judith Grabiner
- 2024 Leo Corry
- 2027 Karine Chemla

== See also ==
- List of mathematics awards
