= Jörg Bewersdorff =

German mathematician

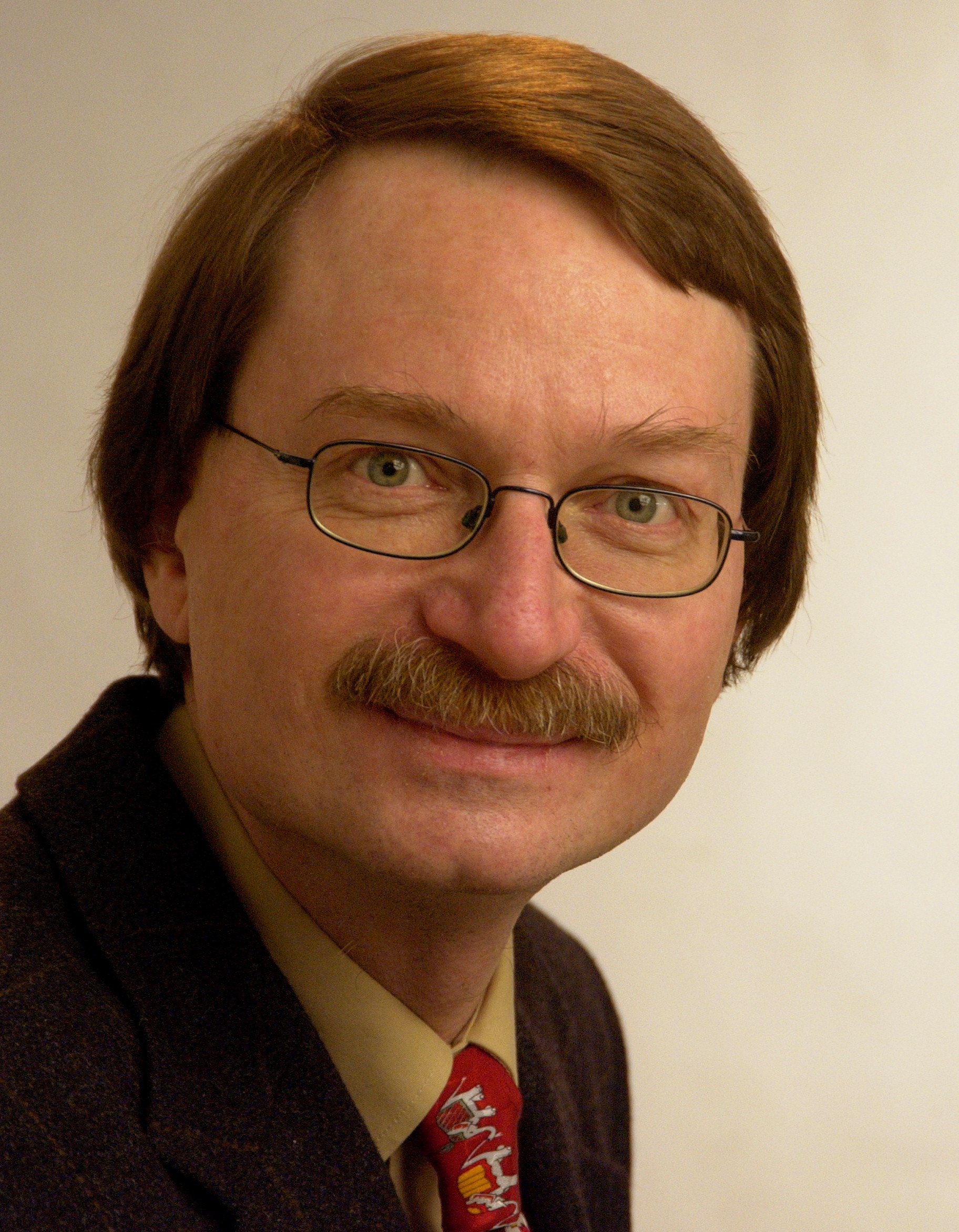
Bewersdorff in 2006

Jörg Bewersdorff (born 1 February 1958 in Neuwied) is a German mathematician who is working as mathematics writer and game designer.

== Life and work ==
After obtaining his Abitur from the Werner-Heisenberg-Gymnasium in Neuwied Bewersdorff studied mathematics from 1975 to 1982 at the University of Bonn. In 1982 he submitted his diploma in mathematics in Bonn and in 1985 he received his doctorate there under the supervision of Günter Harder (A Lefschetz fixed point formula for Hecke operators).

In 1985 Bewersdorff started a career as game designer. Since 1998 he is general manager of subsidiaries of the Gauselmann AG. Bewersdorff is author of four textbooks dealing with probability theory, mathematics of gambling, game theory, combinatorial game theory, Galois theory, mathematical statistics, JavaScript and object-oriented programming. Two of them were translated into English. One book was translated also to Korean. Bewersdorff's books are undergraduate level books. Their goal is to explain applications and what is going on behind the formalism.

== Publications ==
- Bewersdorff, Jörg (8 March 2021). Luck, Logic, and White Lies. Boca Raton: AK Peters/CRC Press: A K Peters/CRC Press. doi:10.1201/9781003092872. ISBN 978-1-003-09287-2. S2CID 233809522. translation of Bewersdorff, Jörg (2018). Glück, Logik und Bluff. Wiesbaden: Springer Fachmedien Wiesbaden. doi:10.1007/978-3-658-21765-5. ISBN 978-3-658-21764-8.
- Bewersdorff, Jörg (2021). Galois theory for beginners : a historical perspective. Providence, Rhode Island: American Mathematical Society. ISBN 978-1-4704-6500-1. OCLC 1242021873. translation of Bewersdorff, Jörg (2019). Algebra für Einsteiger. Wiesbaden: Springer Fachmedien Wiesbaden. doi:10.1007/978-3-658-26152-8. ISBN 978-3-658-26151-1. S2CID 122472930.
- Bewersdorff, Jörg (2021). Statistik – wie und warum sie funktioniert. Ein mathematisches Lesebuch mit einer Einführung in R. Wiesbaden: Vieweg+Teubner Verlag. doi:10.1007/978-3-662-63712-8. ISBN 978-3-662-63711-1.
- Bewersdorff, Jörg (2018). Objektorientierte Programmierung mit JavaScript. Wiesbaden: Springer Fachmedien Wiesbaden. doi:10.1007/978-3-658-21077-9. ISBN 978-3-658-21076-2.
