= Casanova's Lottery =

2022 non-fiction book by Stephen M. Stigler

Casanova's Lottery: The History of a Revolutionary Game of Chance
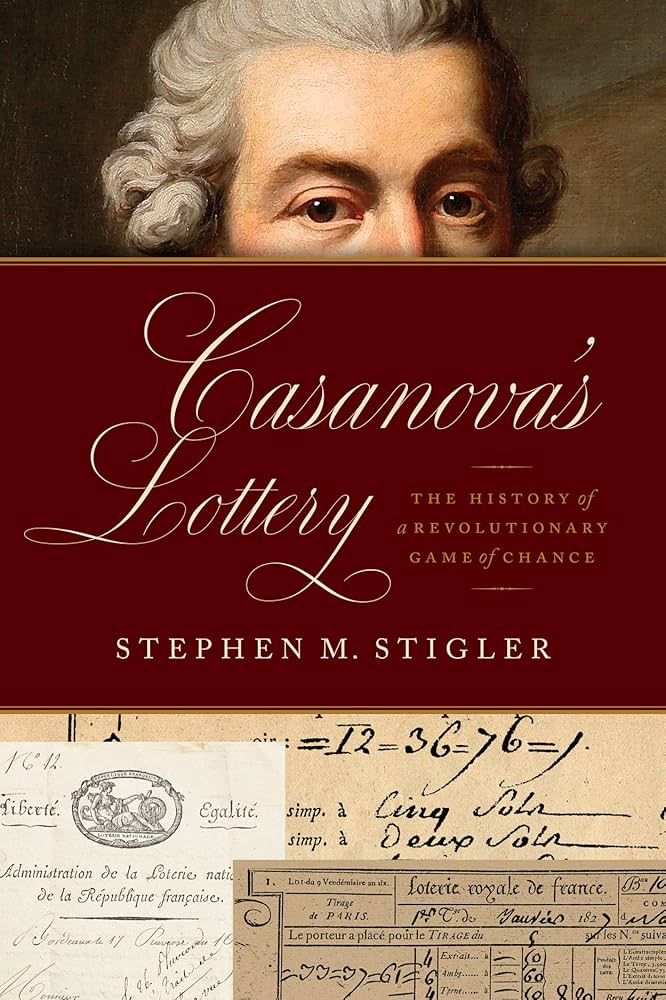
- Author: Stephen M. Stigler
- Language: English
- Subjects: History, Probability, Statistics
- Publisher: Chicago University Press
- Publication date: 2022
- Pages: 232
- ISBN: 978-0-226-82079-8

Casanova's Lottery: The History of a Revolutionary Game of Chance is a history book about the French Loterie by historian and statistician Stephen M. Stigler.

== Content ==
It is easy to associate statistics with death, thanks to actuarial tables and life expectancies, but the history of statistics also contains its libidinal opposite. Amid frequency distributions and tables of payout odds, Casanova's Lottery reminds us that the history of statistics is also a history of dreams, sex, and hope.

Stigler's Casanova's Lottery: The History of a Revolutionary Game of Chance tells how, thanks to the direct involvement of the Venetian Giacomo Casanova, the French Loterie was established, lasting from 1758 to 1836 – with a four-year interruption during the French Revolution in 1793–1797. A quarter of a billion tickets were sold over that period through lottery offices all over France, thanks to which the state budget received "millions of livres (and then francs)".

The Loterie was unique because, unlike a raffle, the maximum possible winning to be disbursed by the state to the winners was not known in advance. Thus, it was considerably riskier for the French administration, be it monarchical, republican, or imperial.

At each drawing, the state was at risk of losing a large amount; what is more, that risk was precisely calculable, generally well understood, and yet taken on by the state with little more than a mathematical theory to protect it.

Bets were made on the drawing without replacement of five random numbers out of a total of 90 numbers, each number being associated with a woman's name to make fraud more difficult. Bettors wagered on one, two or three (and later four) numbers.

The book describes the various stages of the Loterie. Initially established to fund the French École militaire – the discussions leading to the establishment of the school saw the direct involvement of the creator of the École militaire, Joseph Pâris Duverney, as well as of the French academician Jean d'Alembert, of Madame Pompadour and of Casanova – the lottery was subsequently conducted under the responsibility of the ministry of finance.

Among the interesting stories told in the volume is how Voltaire won a fortune of several million francs by participating to a scheme in an earlier French state lottery that aimed at reimbursing state debtors.

The interest of the book also comes from the author's statistical expertise. Stigler relies on Menut de Saint Mesmin's Almanach Romain sur la loterie de France, published in 1834, and intended as a guide for bettors. Since the Almanach reports the winning numbers drawn since 1758 as well as the prizes paid out, it constitutes for Stigler

a precisely randomized survey of the French betting public [...] "more than a century before randomized surveys were invented".

Two appendices describe respectively the formulae for the calculus of probabilities relative to the lottery and a theorem from Pierre-Simon Laplace on the distribution of the number of draws needed for all 90 numbers to appear at least once.

The book won the 2023 Neumann Prize of the British Society for the History of Mathematics.

== See also ==
- Lottery
- Raffle
- Game of chance
