= Jules Molk =

French mathematician

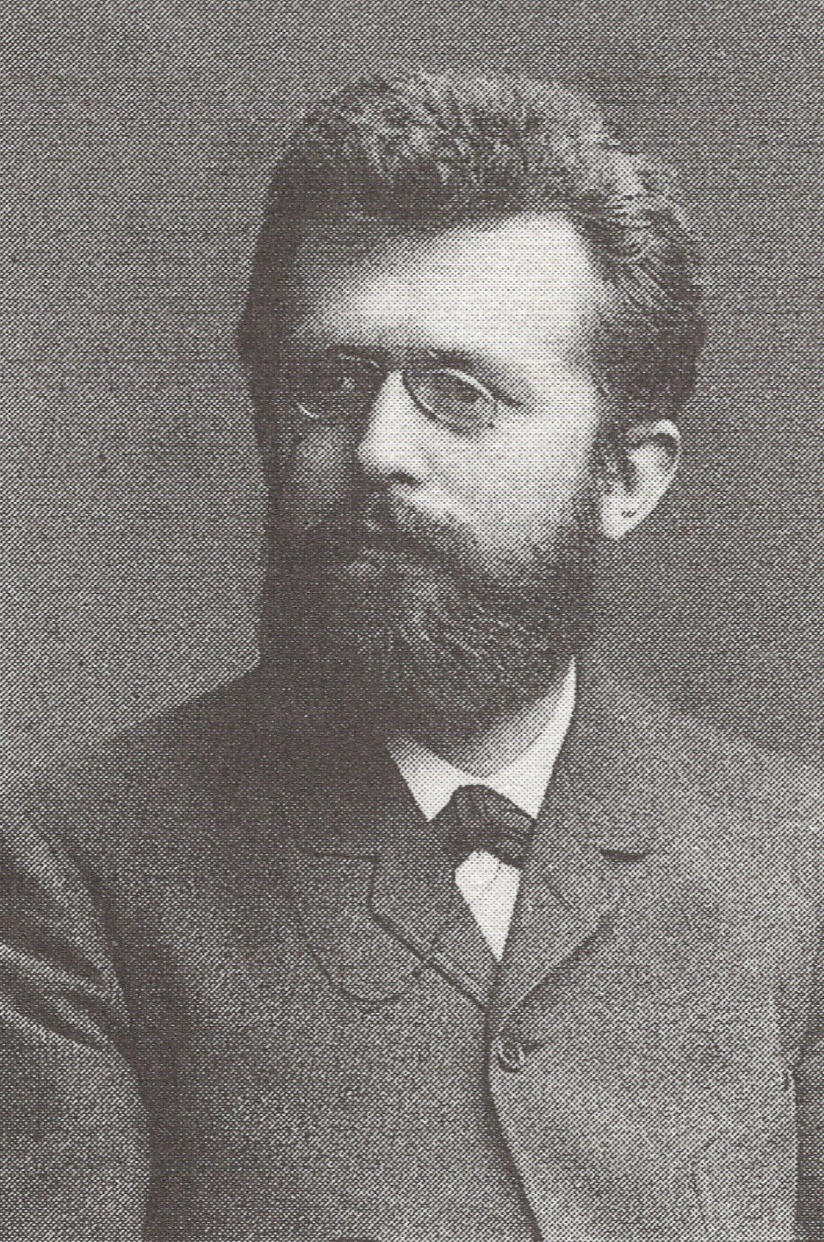
- Born: 8 December 1857; Strasbourg, France
- Died: 7 May 1914 (aged 56); Nancy, France
- Citizenship: France
- Scientific career
- Fields: Mathematics
- Thesis: Sur une notion qui comprend celle de la divisibilité et sur la théorie générale de l'élimination (1884)

Jules Molk (8 December 1857 in Strasbourg, France – 7 May 1914 in Nancy) was a French mathematician who worked on elliptic functions.

The French Academy of Sciences awarded him the Prix Binoux for 1913.

He was appointed to the chair of applied mathematics at the University of Nancy upon the death of Émile Léonard Mathieu in 1890. From 1902 until his death in 1914, Molk was the leader and editor-in-chief of the publication of a French encyclopedia of pure and applied mathematical sciences based upon Klein's encyclopedia. It was a translation of the volumes in German and required the collaboration of many mathematicians and theoretical physicists from France, Germany, and several other European countries. Among the noteworthy contributors are: Paul Appell, Felix Klein, Jacques Hadamard, David Hilbert, Émile Borel, Paul Montel, Maurice Fréchet, Édouard Goursat, Ernst Zermelo, Ernst Steinitz, Arthur Schoenflies, Philipp Furtwängler, Carl Runge, Vilfredo Pareto, Ernest Vessiot, Gino Fano, George Darwin, Paul Langevin, Jean Perrin, Karl Schwarzschild, Pierre Boutroux, Edmond Bauer, Max Abraham, Arnold Sommerfeld, Ernest Esclangon, Paul Ehrenfest, and Tatyana Pavlovna Ehrenfest.

The French edition of the Encyclopaedia of the Pure Mathematical Sciences edited and published after the German edition is neither a straight translation nor a simple adaptation for the French readership. It was intended as an erudite and sometimes controversial re-reading of the German edition, by a group of scholars brought together by Jules Molk, professor of rational mechanics at the University of Nancy. He was familiar with the scientific literature in Germany having lived in Berlin between 1880 and 1884 and having written a thesis focused on an overview of the German breakthroughs in Mathematics. The first volumes of this French edition appeared in 1908, with the help of ... Teubner and Gauthier Villars, and the last in 1916, two years after the death of Jules Molk. Only half of the volumes released from Teubner in 1908 were published, and that with some difficulty. Nevertheless, such a Franco-German scientific collaboration was remarkable and totally new.

In 1906 Molk was elected a member of the Academy of Sciences Leopoldina.

== Publications ==
- Tannery, Jules; Molk, Jules (1972) [1893], Éléments de la théorie des fonctions elliptiques. Tomes I, II, III, IV. Calcul différentiel, New York: Chelsea Publishing Co., ISBN 978-0-8284-0257-6, MR 0392471
- Éléments de la théorie des fonctions elliptiques. Tome 1, sur Gallica.
- Éléments de la théorie des fonctions elliptiques. Tome 2, sur Gallica.
- Éléments de la théorie des fonctions elliptiques. Tome 4, sur Gallica.
- Éléments de la théorie des fonctions elliptiques Volumes 1 et 2, sur Archive.org.
- Éléments de la théorie des fonctions elliptiques Tome 1, sur Archive.org.

=== Encyclopédie des sciences mathématiques pures et appliquées ===
- Site des Editions Jacques Gabay
- Linum, livres numériques mathématiques
- Encyclopédie des sciences mathématiques pures et appliquées Volume 1, sur Archive.org.
- Encyclopédie des sciences mathématiques pures et appliquées Tome 4 Volume 2, sur IRIS.
- Encyclopédie des sciences mathématiques pures et appliquées Tome 2, Premier volume, sur Gallica.
- Encyclopédie des sciences mathématiques pures et appliquées Tome 2, Deuxième volume, sur Gallica.
- Encyclopédie des sciences mathématiques pures et appliquées Tome 4, Cinquième volume, sur Gallica.
- Encyclopédie des sciences mathématiques pures et appliquées Tome 4, Sixième volume, sur Gallica.
