= British Society for the History of Mathematics =

Organization in the UK

The British Society for the History of Mathematics (BSHM) was founded in 1971 to promote research into the history of mathematics at all levels and to further the use of the history of mathematics in education.

The BSHM is concerned with all periods and cultures, and with all aspects of mathematics. It participates in the Joint Mathematical Council of the United Kingdom.

The Society's journal, the British Journal for the History of Mathematics, is published on behalf of BSHM by Taylor & Francis.

== Neumann Prize ==
The Neumann prize is awarded biennially by the BSHM for "a book in English (including books in translation) dealing with the history of mathematics and aimed at a broad audience." The prize was named in honour of Peter M. Neumann, who was a longstanding supporter of and contributor to the society. It carries an award of £600.The previous winners are:

- 2025: The Waltz of Reason: The Entanglement of Mathematics and Philosophy, Karl Sigmund
- 2023: Casanova's Lottery: The History of a Revolutionary Game of Chance, Stephen M. Stigler
- 2021: The Flying Mathematicians of World War I, Tony Royle
- 2019: Going Underground, Martin Beech
- 2017: A Mind at Play, Jimmy Soni & Rob Goodman
- 2015: The Thrilling Adventures of Lovelace and Babbage, Sydney Padua.
- 2013: The History of Mathematics: A Very Short Introduction, Jacqueline Stedall.
- 2011: The Math Book, Clifford A. Pickover.
- 2009: The Archimedes Codex, Reviel Netz and William Noel.

== Other prizes ==
- HiMEd Awards
- LMS-BSHM Hirst Prize (jointly awarded by the London Mathematical Society and the BSHM)
- Schools Prize
- Taylor and Francis Early Career Research Prize
- Undergraduate Essay Prize

== Presidents of the BSHM ==
- 1971–1973: Gerald Whitrow
- 1974–1976: Clive Kilmister
- 1977–1979: John Dubbey
- 1980–1982: Graham Flegg
- 1983–1985: Frank Smithies
- 1986–1988: Ivor Grattan-Guinness
- 1989–1991: Eric Aiton
- 1992–1994: John Fauvel
- 1995–1996: Steve Russ
- 1997–1999: Judith V. Field
- 2000–2002: Peter Neumann
- 2003–2005: June Barrow-Green
- 2006–2008: Raymond Flood
- 2009–2011: Tony Mann
- 2012–2014: Robin Wilson
- 2015 - 2017: Philip Beeley
- 2018 - 2020: Mark McCartney
- 2021 - 2023: Sarah B. Hart
- 2023 : Christopher Hollings
