= Snezana Lawrence =

Snezana Lawrence FIMA is a Yugoslav and British historian of mathematics, formerly a senior lecturer in mathematics and design engineering at Middlesex University.

== Education and career ==
Lawrence is originally from Yugoslavia, of mixed Serbian and Jewish ancestry. She studied descriptive geometry at the University of Belgrade before moving to England in 1991 during the Breakup of Yugoslavia and ensuing Yugoslav Wars, and later becoming a naturalized British citizen. She earned her PhD from the Open University in 2002. Her dissertation, Geometry of Architecture and Freemasonry in 19th Century England, was supervised by Jeremy Gray.

While working as a secondary school teacher at St Edmund's Catholic School, Dover in 2004–2005, she won a Gatsby Teacher Fellowship in Mathematics, with which she started a popular web site "Maths is Good For You". The site had the aim of providing a resource to bring more work on the history of mathematics into the secondary school curriculum.

Subsequently, Lawrence moved to post-secondary education, including work as a senior lecturer at Bath Spa University, Anglia Ruskin University, and Middlesex University.

== Books ==
Lawrence is the author of

- A New Year’s Present from a Mathematician (Chapman Hall / CRC Press, 2019), on the nature of mathematics and the definition of mathematicians,
- Mathematical Meditations (A K Peters/CRC Press, 2025), and
- A Little History of Mathematics (Yale University Press, 2025).

She is the co-editor, with Irish mathematician Mark McCartney, of the book Mathematicians and their Gods: Interactions between mathematics and religious beliefs (Oxford University Press, 2015), on connections between mathematics and religion.

== Recognition ==
Lawrence is a Fellow of the Institute of Mathematics and its Applications, for whom she was Diversity Champion 2019-2023 and is an elected council member.
