= Erhard Scholz =

German historian of mathematics (born 1947)

Erhard Scholz (born 1947) is a German historian of mathematics with interests in the history of mathematics in the 19th and 20th centuries, historical perspective on the philosophy of mathematics and science, and Hermann Weyl's geometrical methods applied to gravitational theory.

== Education and career ==
Scholz studied mathematics at the University of Bonn and the University of Warwick from 1968 to 1975 with Diplom from the University of Bonn in 1975. In 1979, he completed his doctorate (Promotion) at the University of Bonn with thesis Entwicklung des Mannigfaltigkeitsbegriffs von Riemann bis Poincaré (Development of the concept of manifold from Riemann to Poincaré) under the supervision of Egbert Brieskorn and Henk J. M. Bos. In 1986, Scholtz habilitated at the University of Wuppertal. There he became in 1989 an associate professor of the history of mathematics and retired in 2012. He also works at the University of Wuppertal's Interdisziplinären Zentrum für Wissenschafts- und Technikforschung (IZWT, Interdisciplinary Center for Science and Technology Research), which he co-founded in 2004. In 1993, he was a visiting professor at the Institut für Wissenschaftsgeschichte (Institute for the History of Science) at the University of Göttingen.

Scholz's research deals with the emergence of the manifold concept developed by Riemann, Poincaré and others, as well as the historical relations of mathematics to its applications in the 19th century. Scholz has investigated Karl Culmann's graphic statics, the determination of the crystallographic space group by Evgraf Fedorov, the applied mathematics of Hermann Grassmann, and the relation of Gauss's ideas on non-Euclidean geometry to his geodetic work. Continuing these investigations into the beginnings of group theory and concept of a mathematical manifold, Scholz has dealt intensively with Hermann Weyl's work in connection with general relativity theory, cosmology, gauge theory, and quantum mechanics and, especially, Weyl metrics in cosmology. Scholz wrote an article on Oswald Teichmüller for the Dictionary of Scientific Biography and an article, with Norbert Schappacher, in the Jahresberich (annual report) of the Deutsche Mathematiker Vereinigung (DMV). Scholz also pursued connections between the history of mathematics and philosophy, such as the historical and philosophical relations of Riemann's work to that of Johann Friedrich Herbart, of 19th-century crystallography to the work of Schelling, and of Hermann Weyl's philosophy of mathematics to the work of Leibniz.

Scholz was an invited speaker of the International Congress of Mathematicians in 1994 in Zürich. He is a co-editor, with Friedrich Hirzebruch, Reinhold Remmert, Walter Purkert, and Egbert Brieskorn, of the collected works of Felix Hausdorff. Scholz was awarded the London Mathematical Society's Hirst Prize and Lectureship in 2023.

== Selected publications ==
- Scholz, Erhard (1980). Geschichte des Mannigfaltigkeitsbegriffs von Riemann bis Poincare (in German). Boston: Birkhäuser. ISBN 978-3-7643-3023-1. OCLC 6602201.
- Scholz, Erhard (1999). "The Concept of Manifold, 1850–1950". History of Topology. Elsevier. pp. 25–64. doi:10.1016/b978-044482375-5/50003-1. ISBN 978-0-444-82375-5.
- Scholz, Erhard (1989). Symmetrie, Gruppe, Dualität : Zur Beziehung zwischen theoretischer Mathematik und Anwendungen in Kristallographie und Baustatik des 19. Jahrhunderts (in German). Basel: Birkhäuser Basel. ISBN 978-3-0348-9267-4. OCLC 851772224.
- as editor: Geschichte der Algebra, Bibliographisches Institut, Mannheim 1990
- as editor: Hermann Weyl´s Raum-Zeit-Materie and a general introduction to his scientific work, Birkhäuser 2001
