= Walter Borho =

German mathematician (born 1945)

Walter Borho (born 1945) is a German mathematician, who works on algebra and number theory. He is retired as a university professor at the University of Wuppertal.

== Early life and education ==
Borho was born in 1945 in Hamburg. He received his PhD in 1973 from the University of Hamburg under the direction of Ernst Witt with a thesis titled Wesentliche ganze Erweiterungen kommutativer Ringe.

== Awards and honors ==
In 1986 he was an invited speaker at the International Congress of Mathematicians in Berkeley, California.

== Selected publications ==
=== Books ===
- Borho, Walter; Gabriel, Peter; Rentschler, Rudolf (1973). Primideale in Einhüllenden auflösbarer Lie-Algebren (Beschreibung durch Bahnenräume). Lecture Notes in Mathematics. Vol. 357. Berlin-New York: Springer-Verlag. MR 0376790. Zbl 0293.17005.
- Borho, Walter; Zagier, Don; Rohlfs, Jürgen; Kraft, Hanspeter; Jantzen, Jens Carsten (1981). Lebendige Zahlen. Fünf Exkursionen [Living Numbers. Five Excursions]. Mathematische Miniaturen. Birkhäuser. Zbl 0539.10001. Translated into Russian by Mir, 1985, Zbl 0669.10001.
- Bongartz, K.; Borho, W.; Mertens, D.; Stein, A. (1988). Farbige Parkette. Mathematische Theorie und Ausführung mit dem Computer. Vier Aufsätze zur ebenen Kristallographie [Coloured tesselations. Mathematical theory and realization with the computer. Four essays on plane crystallography]. Birkhäuser. ISBN 3-7643-2223-3. Zbl 0648.20052.
- Borho, W.; Brylinski, J.-L.; MacPherson, R. (1989). Nilpotent orbits, primitive ideals, and characteristic classes: A geometric perspective in ring theory. Progress in Mathematics. Vol. 78. Birkhäuser. doi:10.1007/978-1-4612-4558-2. ISBN 0-8176-3473-8. MR 1034480. Zbl 0697.17006.

=== Research articles ===
- Borho, Walter (1972). "On Thabit ibn Kurrah's formula for amicable numbers". Mathematics of Computation. 26: 571–578. doi:10.2307/2005185. JSTOR 2005185. MR 0313177. Zbl 0237.10012.
- Borho, Walter; Kraft, Hanspeter (1976). "Über die Gelfand-Kirillov-Dimension" [On the Gelfand–Kirillov dimension]. Mathematische Annalen. 220 (1): 1–24. doi:10.1007/BF01354525. MR 0412240. Zbl 0306.17005.
- Borho, Walter; Kraft, Hanspeter (1979). "Über Bahnen und deren Deformationen bei linearen Aktionen reduktiver Gruppen". Commentarii Mathematici Helvetici. 54 (1): 61–104. doi:10.1007/BF02566256. MR 0522032. Zbl 0395.14013.
- Borho, Walter; Brylinski, Jean-Luc (1982). "Differential operators on homogeneous spaces. I. Irreducibility of the associated variety for annihilators of induced modules". Inventiones Mathematicae. 69 (3): 437–476. doi:10.1007/BF01389364. MR 0679767. Zbl 0504.22015.
- Borho, W.; Brylinski, J.-L. (1985). "Differential operators on homogeneous spaces. III. Characteristic varieties of Harish-Chandra modules and of primitive ideals". Inventiones Mathematicae. 80 (1): 1–68. doi:10.1007/BF01388547. MR 0784528. Zbl 0577.22014.
