= Giulio Bisconcini =

Italian mathematician (1880–1969)

Giulio Ugo Bisconcini (2 March 1880, Padua – 1969) was an Italian mathematician, known for his work on the three-body problem.

== Education and career ==
Biscocini received his laurea in mathematics in 1901 at the University of Padua. In 1906 he was appointed an academic assistant in analytic and projective geometry at the University of Rome. He was also a professor ordinarius at the commercial institute "Luigi di Savoia - Duca degli Abruzzi" in Rome. At the University of Rome he became a libero docente (lecturer) on rational mechanics, i.e. classical mechanics as a mathematical system based on axioms. At the beginning of his career he did research on number theory, but he soon began to specialize in rational mechanics. His research dealt with the classification of the types of holonomic systems and the three-body problem.

Bisconcini was one of the professors conducting the Università clandestina di Roma (1941–1943), which was organized by Guido Castelnuovo to teach secret university courses to Jews and disfavored opponents of fascism.

== Bisconcini's work on the three-body problem ==
According to Daniel Buchanan:

Levi-Civita showed that in the case of the restricted problem (one mass infinitesimal, the finite masses moving in circles) it is possible to determine the character of the motion near collision without difficulty and that the only singularities are branch-points. This was later shown by Bisconcini to be the case in the general problem when the three masses are finite, but he made an assumption which seemed evident but which he was unable to prove, viz., that the angular velocity of the radius vector of two bodies which collide remains finite as the time approaches the instant of collision. The contribution made by Sundman which marked the climax of the solution of the problem was to substantiate the assumption made by Bisconcini. While no attempt should be made to belittle the profound results of Sundman, it must be stated that they are disappointing as they give no information concerning the properties of the motion and are unsuitable for practical applications.

According to June Barrow-Green:

Bisconcini's result was important, but it did not provide a satisfactory solution to the problem. In the first place, his solution involved a complicated power series that was not all easy to use. But rather more problematic was the fact the series was only applicable when the interval of the time between the start of the motion and the collision was sufficiently short, and he gave no conditions for the latter condition, So there was still a need both to simplify the solution and to increase the range of its application. Moreover, Bisconcini had considered only the problem of a binary collision and not that of a triple collision.
