= Antoni Malet =

Spanish historian of mathematics (born 1950)

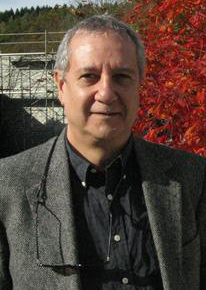
- Malet in 2009
- Born: 23 February 1950 (age 76)
- Education: Princeton University
- Scientific career
- Fields: History of science
- Workplaces: Pompeu Fabra University
- Doctoral advisor: Charles Gillispie

Antoni Malet (born 23 February 1950) is a Catalan historian of mathematics. He is a professor of history of science at Pompeu Fabra University, Barcelona. His research interests are mostly in the history of mathematics and optics in the sixteenth and seventeenth centuries.

Malet earned his Ph.D. in 1989 from Princeton University as a student of Charles Gillispie, with the thesis Studies on James Gregorie (1638–1675).

Malet served as president of the European Society for the History of Science 2016–2018.

== Selected publications ==
- "From Indivisibles to Infinitesimals. Studies on Seventeenth-Century Mathematizations of Infinitely Small Quantities". Barcelona 1996.
- "Ferran Sunyer i Balaguer (1912–1967)". Barcelona 1995.
- with J. Paradís: "Els orígens i l'ensenyament de l'àlgebra simbòlica" (in Catalan). Barcelona 1984.
- "James Gregorie on Tangents and the "Taylor" Rule of Series Expansions". Archive for History of Exact Sciences, Volume 46, 1993, 97–137.
- "Mil años de matematicas en Iberia". In: A. Duran (Herausgeber): El legado de las matematicas. Universität Sevilla 2000, S. 193–224.
- "Kepler and the Telescope". Annals of Science, 60, 2003, 107–36.
- "Isaac Barrow on the Mathematization of Nature: Theological Voluntarism and the Rise of Geometrical Optics". Journal of the History of Ideas, 58, 1997, 265–287.
- "Gregorie, Descartes, Kepler, and the Law of Refraction". Archives Internationales d'Histoire des Sciences, 40, 1990, 278–304.

Professional and academic associations
Preceded by Karine Chemla	President of the European Society for the History of Science; 2016–2018	Succeeded by Ana Simões (pt:Ana Simões)
