= Günter Harder =

German mathematician (1938–2025)

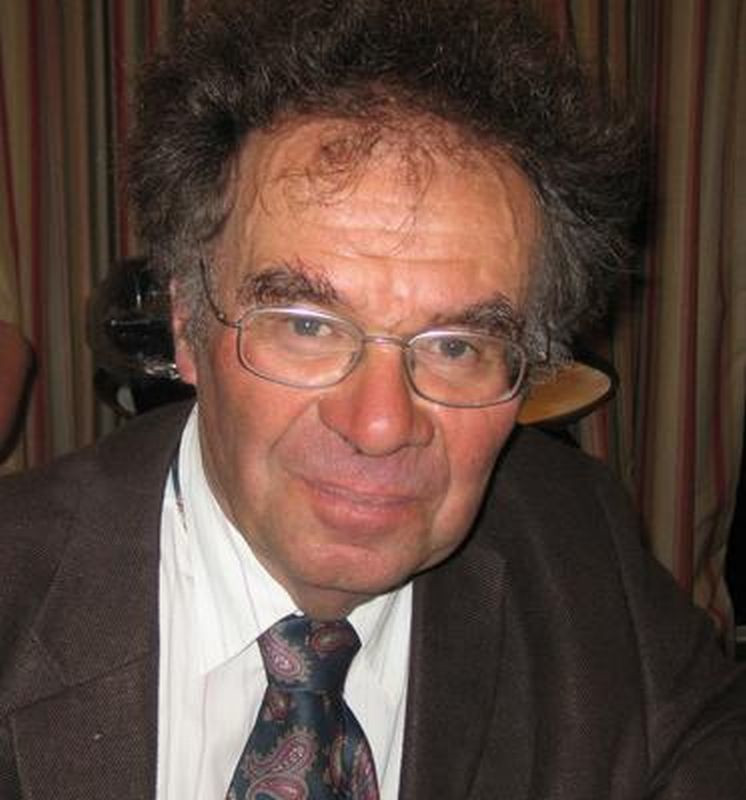
- Harder in 2008
- Born: 14 March 1938; Ratzeburg, Gau Schleswig-Holstein, Germany
- Died: 10 June 2025 (aged 87)
- Education: University of Hamburg
- Occupation: University mathematics professor

Günter Harder (14 March 1938 – 10 June 2025) was a German mathematician, specializing in arithmetic geometry and number theory.

== Education ==
Harder studied mathematics and physics in Hamburg and Göttingen. Simultaneously with the Staatsexamen in 1964 in Hamburg, he received his doctoral degree (Dr. rer. nat.) under Ernst Witt with a thesis Über die Galoiskohomologie der Tori. Two years later, he completed his habilitation.

== Career ==
After a one-year postdoctorate position at Princeton University and a position as an assistant professor at the University of Heidelberg, he became a professor ordinarius at the University of Bonn. With the exception of a six-year stay at the former Universität-Gesamthochschule Wuppertal, Harder remained at the University of Bonn until his retirement in 2003. From 1995 to 2006, he was one of the directors of the Max-Planck-Institut für Mathematik in Bonn.

He was a visiting professor at Harvard University, Yale University, at Princeton's Institute for Advanced Study (IAS) (for the academic years 1966–1967, 1972–1973, 1986–1987, autumn of 1983, autumn of 2006), at the Institut des Hautes Études Scientifiques (I.H.É.S.) in Paris, at the Tata Institute of Fundamental Research in Mumbai, and at the Mathematical Sciences Research Institute (MSRI) at the University of California, Berkeley.

For decades, Harder was known to German mathematicians as the Spiritus Rector for a mathematical workshop held for one week in spring and one week in autumn; the workshop, sponsored by the Mathematical Research Institute of Oberwolfach, introduced young mathematicians and scientists to important new developments in pure mathematics and mathematical sciences.

Harder's doctoral students include Kai Behrend, Jörg Bewersdorff, Joachim Schwermer, and Maria Heep-Altiner.

== Death ==
Harder died on 10 June 2025, at the age of 87.

== Research ==
His research deals with arithmetic geometry, automorphic forms, Shimura varieties, motives, and algebraic number theory. He made foundational contributions to the Waldspurger formula.

With Ina Kersten, he was a co-editor of the collected works of Ernst Witt.

== Awards and honours ==
Harder was an invited speaker at the International Congress of Mathematicians in 1970 and gave a talk titled Semisimple group schemes over curves and automorphic functions and in 1990 with a talk titled Eisenstein cohomology of arithmetic groups and its applications to number theory. In 1988, he was awarded the Leibniz Prize by the Deutsche Forschungsgemeinschaft.

In 2004, Harder received, with Friedhelm Waldhausen, the von Staudt Prize.

== Selected publications ==
- Harder, G. (1971). "A Gauss-Bonnet formula for discrete arithmetically defined groups". Annales scientifiques de l'École normale supérieure. 4 (3). Societe Mathematique de France: 409–455. doi:10.24033/asens.1217. ISSN 0012-9593. (online).
- Harder, G. (1974). "Chevalley Groups Over Function Fields and Automorphic Forms". The Annals of Mathematics. 100 (2). JSTOR: 249–306. doi:10.2307/1971073. ISSN 0003-486X. JSTOR 1971073.
- Harder, G.; Narasimhan, M. S. (1975). "On the cohomology groups of moduli spaces of vector bundles on curves". Mathematische Annalen. 212 (3). Springer Science and Business Media LLC: 215–248. doi:10.1007/bf01357141. ISSN 0025-5831. S2CID 117851906. (online)
- "Algebraische Zyklen auf Hilbert-Blumenthal-Flächen". Journal für die reine und angewandte Mathematik (Crelle's Journal). 1986 (366). Walter de Gruyter GmbH: 53–120. 1 March 1986. doi:10.1515/crll.1986.366.53. ISSN 0075-4102. S2CID 119657447. (online).
- Harder, G. (1987). "Eisenstein cohomology of arithmetic groups. The case GL2". Inventiones Mathematicae. 89 (1). Springer Science and Business Media LLC: 37–118. Bibcode:1987InMat..89...37H. doi:10.1007/bf01404673. ISSN 0020-9910. S2CID 121239087.
- Goresky, M.; Harder, G.; MacPherson, R. (1994). "Weighted cohomology". Inventiones Mathematicae. 116 (1). Springer Science and Business Media LLC: 139–213. Bibcode:1994InMat.116..139G. doi:10.1007/bf01231560. ISSN 0020-9910. S2CID 189831832.
- Harder, Günter (1993). "Eisensteinkohomologie und die Konstruktion gemischter Motive". Lecture Notes in Mathematics. Vol. 1562. Berlin, Heidelberg: Springer Berlin Heidelberg. doi:10.1007/bfb0090305. ISBN 978-3-540-57408-8. ISSN 0075-8434.
- Harder, Günter (2011). "Lectures on Algebraic Geometry I". Aspects of Mathematics. Vol. 35. Wiesbaden: Springer Fachmedien Wiesbaden. doi:10.1007/978-3-8348-8330-8. ISBN 978-3-8348-1844-7. ISSN 0179-2156.
- Harder, Günter (2011). Lectures on Algebraic Geometry II. Wiesbaden: Vieweg+Teubner. doi:10.1007/978-3-8348-8159-5. ISBN 978-3-8348-0432-7.
- Bruinier, Jan (2008). The 1-2-3 of modular forms : lectures at a summer school in Nordfjordeid, Norway. Berlin: Springer. ISBN 978-3-540-74117-6. OCLC 233973403. (contains Harder's contribution: Harder, Günter (2008). "Congruence Between a Siegel and an Elliptic Modular Form". The 1-2-3 of Modular Forms. Berlin, Heidelberg: Springer Berlin Heidelberg. pp. 247–262. doi:10.1007/978-3-540-74119-0_4. ISBN 978-3-540-74117-6.)
