= Charles Coulston Gillispie =

American historian of science (1918–2015)

- Born: August 6, 1918; Harrisburg, Pennsylvania
- Died: October 6, 2015 (aged 97); Princeton, New Jersey
- Occupation: Historian of science
- Title: Dayton-Stockton Professor of History of Science
- Awards: Guggenheim Fellowship (two: 1954, 1970); Dartmouth Medal (1981); Pfizer Award (1981); George Sarton Medal (1984); Balzan Prize (1997)

Academic background
- Education: Wesleyan University (BA 1940); Harvard University (PhD 1949)
- Thesis: Genesis and Geology
- Doctoral advisor: David Owen

Academic work
- Discipline: History of science
- Institutions: Princeton University (1947–1987)
- Doctoral students: Antoni Malet
- Notable works: Dictionary of Scientific Biography; The Edge of Objectivity; Science and Polity in France

Charles Coulston Gillispie (/ɡɪˈlɪspi/; August 6, 1918 – October 6, 2015) was an American historian of science. He was the Dayton-Stockton Professor of History of Science at Princeton University, and was credited with building Princeton's history of science program into a leading center for the field. He was best known for his general introduction to the history of science, The Edge of Objectivity, his deep two-volume study of French scientific history Science and Polity in France, and his chief editor role for the 16-volume, 5,000-entry Dictionary of Scientific Biography.

== Early life and education ==
The son of Raymond Livingston Gillispie and Virginia Coulston, Gillispie grew up in Bethlehem, Pennsylvania. He attended Wesleyan University, graduating in 1940 with a major in chemistry and also a distinguished thesis in history. He then spent one year at the Massachusetts Institute of Technology studying chemical engineering before transferring to Harvard to pursue history in 1941. He was then drafted into the US Army for World War II and served as a captain and company commander in the 94th Chemical Mortar Battalion after attending officer training school.

Gillispie returned to Harvard in 1946 and gained his PhD from Harvard University in 1949 with a thesis supervised by British historian David Owen that became his first published book, Genesis and Geology, in 1951. His first published article concerned French philosopher and historian of England Élie Halévy, and Halévy was later noted by Gerald Holton as a major intellectual and stylistic influence on Gillispie.

== Career ==
Gillispie joined the Department of History at Princeton University in 1947 after being recommended for an instructorship in British history by his advisor Owen. He was awarded his first Guggenheim Fellowship in 1954. He taught his first undergraduate class in the history of science from 1956 to 1958, developing a curriculum that formed the basis for his 1960 book The Edge of Objectivity, a seminal general introduction to the history of science that Gillispie dedicated to the students of his classes.

He established the Princeton Program in History of Science in 1960 and strengthened it into a leading program in subsequent years, for instance hiring Thomas Kuhn in 1964. He was elected a member of the American Academy of Arts and Sciences in 1963 and served as president of the History of Science Society for 1965–66. He was awarded his second Guggenheim Fellowship in 1970 and he chaired Princeton's department of history 1971–1973. In 1972, he was elected to the American Philosophical Society.

Gillispie headed the editorial board of the Dictionary of Scientific Biography from 1970 to 1980, for which he received the Dartmouth Medal in 1981. This was an effort involving over a thousand contributors from many countries, both historians and scientists, adding up to over five thousand entries in sixteen volumes. Gillispie undertook the work at the suggestion of Charles Scribner IV and took the lead in arranging an advisory board, arranging support from the American Council of Learned Societies and then the National Science Foundation, and organizing the work.

In 1980 Gillispie published Science and Polity in France at the End of the Old Regime, which won the Pfizer Award in 1981, and he completed the second volume, Science and Polity in France: The Revolutionary and Napoleonic Years, for publication in 2004; combined, the two volumes came to over 1,400 pages. The first volume emphasized the importance of the Ancien régime state for the rise of the sciences, for instance dating the formation of modern science in France to the creation of the French Academy of Sciences in 1666 and emphasizing French administrator Anne Robert Jacques Turgot's work in the 1770s as an epitome of the successful growth of the sciences in France. The second continued the theme by contrasting the negative effects for the sciences of the disorder during the French Revolution and its aftermath: "because of the constant reshaping of committees and legislative bodies, scientific aims were not easily achieved." At the same time, however, war induced new cooperation between science and industry, and Napoleon's Egyptian expeditions inspired significant new scientific developments in botany, topography, and ethnography.

Gillispie was awarded the lifetime achievement George Sarton Medal by the History of Science Society in 1984 and retired from Princeton's faculty in 1987. He was succeeded as Dayton-Stockton Professor of History of Science by Arno J. Mayer. He received the Balzan Prize in 1997 for "the extraordinary contribution he has made to the history and philosophy of science by his intellectually vigorous, precise works, as well as his editing of a great reference work".

Among his notable students was Spanish historian of mathematics Antoni Malet (grad. 1989). In 2012 he was presented with a festschrift, A Master of Science History: Essays in Honor of Charles Coulston Gillispie, edited by Jed Buchwald.

== Family and death ==
Gillispie was married to Emily Clapp Gillispie for sixty-four years. He died on October 6, 2015, in Princeton, New Jersey, at the age of 97.

== Works ==
- Genesis and Geology: A Study in the Relations of Scientific Thought, Natural Theology, and Social Opinion in Britain, 1790–1850, 1951 LCCN 59-6649;
  - Gillispie, Charles Coulston (1996). 1996 pbk reprint. Harvard University Press. ISBN 0-674-34481-2.
- The Edge of Objectivity: An Essay in the History of Scientific Ideas, 1960 LCCN 60-5748
- Lazare Carnot, Savant, 1971 LCCN 78-132238
- Science and Polity in France at the End of the Old Regime, 1980 LCCN 80-7521 ISBN 0691082332 Winner of the 1981 Pfizer Award.
  - Gillispie, Charles Coulston (2009). Science and Polity in France: The End of the Old Regime. Princeton University Press. ISBN 978-0-691-11849-9. pbk reprint with slight change in title.
- The Montgolfier Brothers and the Invention of Aviation, 1783–1784, 1983 LCCN 82-61363 ISBN 0691083215
  - Gillispie, Charles Coulston (14 July 2014). 2014 pbk reprint. Princeton University Press. ISBN 9781400855209.
- Pierre-Simon Laplace, 1749–1827: A Life in Exact Science, 1997 LCCN 97-8331 ISBN 0691011850
  - Gillispie, Charles Coulston (5 June 2018). 2018 pbk reprint. Princeton University Press. ISBN 9780691187983.
- Science and Polity in France: The Revolutionary and Napoleonic Years (2004) ISBN 0-691-11541-9
- Essays and Reviews in History and History of Science, 2006 LCCN 2006-52602 ISBN 9780871699657
- With Raffaele Pisano: Lazare and Sadi Carnot: A Scientific and Filial Relationship. Springer. 2014. ISBN 978-94-017-8011-7.
