= Dmitry Fyodorovich Selivanov =

Russian mathematician

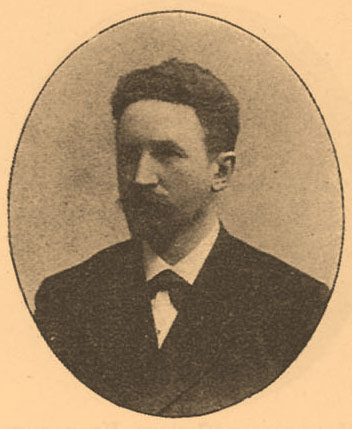
Dmitry Fyodorvich Selivanov

Dmitry Fyodorovich Selivanov, (Дмитрий Фёдорович Селиванов, 17 February 1855, Gorodishche, Gorodishchensky District, Penza Oblast – 5 April 1932, Prague) was a Russian mathematician, known for his work on differential calculus and finite difference calculus.

== Biography ==
The son of a district marshal and justice of the peace, Selivanov was born into a noble family in Penza Oblast, where he attended secondary school. He then studied mathematics and physics at the University of St. Petersburg, where he was taught by, among others, Pafnuty Chebyshev. In 1878 Selivanov graduated and in 1880–1881 studied in Paris under Charles Hermite and in Berlin under Karl Weierstraß and Leopold Kronecker. In Berlin he became friends with mathematicians like Kurt Hensel, Carl Runge, and Adolf Kneser and joined the Berlin Mathematical Society, whose meetings in a café were often attended by Sofia Kovalevskaya. In 1885 he completed in Saint Petersburg his Russian magister degree with dissertation entitled "Теория алгебраического решения уравнений" ("Theory of the algebraic solution of equations"). In 1885 he also received his Russian candidate degree (equivalent of Habilitation) and became the Russian-equivalent of a Privatdozent at the University of St. Petersburg, remaining in that academic position for 20 years, because he did not want to change to a professorship at provincial universities. During those years he also lectured at the St. Petersburg Technological Institute from 1888 to 1900, and from 1889 at the Bestuzhev Women's University, where he met his wife (Yelena Pavlovna Podashevsky, marriage in 1908), who was his student. In 1890 he received the Russian doctorate in Moscow with thesis "Об уравнениях пятой степени с целыми коэффициентами" ("On the solution of equations of the fifth degree with integer coefficients"). In 1905 he became a professor extraordinarius and in 1906 a professor ordinarius at the University of St. Petersburg. After the Russian Revolution, he was arrested and expelled in the fall of 1922 (in his own words, since he could not and did not want to teach mathematics in a "red manner"). He went to Prague, where, with the support of the Czech government, there was a Russian university of exile. In his last years he was impoverished.

== Research and publications ==
Selivanov, following French mathematicians (such as Évariste Galois and Camille Jordan), dealt with the explicit algebraic solution of equations and introduced some simplifications. His work was praised by Hermite, as was his first publication, in which he linked the differentiability of an indefinite integral to a parameter with its uniform convergence (newly introduced by Weierstrass at the time). In 1904 in Leipzig, B. G. Teubner published Selivanov's monograph on the calculus of finite differences (which was also published in Russian and Czech). For Klein's encyclopedia, he wrote in 1901 an article based upon a book published in 1891 by Andrei Andreyevich Markov, a professor extraordinarius in Saint Petersburg. Markov's book was published in German translation in 1896. Selivanov published in German under the name Demetrius Seliwanoff. He published in French under the name D. Sélivanoff. For the French version of Klein's encyclopedia, Henri Andoyer made a 1906 translation combining the article by Selivanov on the calculus of finite differences and the article by Julius Bauschinger on interpolation from the original German version of Klein's encyclopedia.

== Selected publications ==
- "Sur les intégrales définies uniformément convergentes". Bulletin de la Société Mathématique de France. tome 10: 147–162. 1882.
- "Extrait d'une lettre Selivanof à M. Hermite" (PDF). Bulletin des sciences mathématiques et astronomiques. 2e série. 7: 246–247. 1883.
- "Sur la recherche des diviseurs des fonctions entières" (PDF). Bulletin de la Société Mathématique de France. tome 13: 119–131. 1885.
- "Quelques remarques sur les équations du cinquième degré" (PDF). Bulletin de la Société Mathématique de France. tome 21: 97–109. 1893.
- Sélivanoff, D. (1895). "Sur les expressions algébriques". Acta Mathematica. tome 19: 73–91. doi:10.1007/BF02402871.
- О неопределенных выражениях // Известия СПб. Технолог. Инстит. — 1891, 1892.
- О периодических непрерывных дробях // Матем. сборник. — 1890. — Т. 15.
- О разложении чисел на множители // Математический сборник. — 1890. — Т. 15, 16.
- О функциях от разностей корней данного уравнения // Матем. сборник. — 1890. — Т. 15.
- О числовой функии φ (n), выражающей число чисел простых с n и не превосходящих // Протоколы СПб. Матем. Общества. — СПб., 1899.
- Lehrbuch der Differenzrechnung. BG Teubner. 1904. Lehrbuch der Differenzrechnung (archive.org copy). Leipzig B.G. Teubner. 1904.
