= Karine Chemla =

French historian of mathematics and sinologist (born 1957)

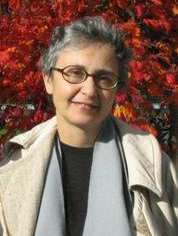
Chemla at Mathematical Research Institute of Oberwolfach in 2009

Karine Chemla (born 8 February 1957) is a French historian of mathematics and sinologist who works as a director of research at the Centre national de la recherche scientifique (CNRS). She is also a senior fellow at the New York University Institute for the Study of the Ancient World. She was elected a Member of the American Philosophical Society in 2019.

== Education ==
Chemla studied at Paris Diderot University and the École normale supérieure de jeunes filles, earning an agrégation in mathematics in 1978 and a diploma of advanced studies in 1979. At this time, her work was in pure mathematics. However, in 1980, influenced by the work of Ilya Prigogine, she won a Singer–Polignac scholarship to travel to China and study the history of Chinese mathematics. Returning to France, she earned her Ph.D. in the history of mathematics from Paris 13 University in 1982, and began working for CNRS at that time.

== Contributions ==
Chemla's research interests include Chinese mathematics, 19th century French geometry, and the theory of the history of mathematics.

With Guo Shuchun, Chemla published in 2004 a critical edition and translation into French of The Nine Chapters on the Mathematical Art. She is also the co-editor, with Cécile Michel, of Mathematics, Administrative and Economic Activities in Ancient Worlds (Springer, 2020).

== Recognition ==
Chemla was an invited speaker at the International Congress of Mathematicians in 1998. She became a member of the Academy of Sciences Leopoldina in 2004, of the International Academy of the History of Science in 2005, and of the Academia Europaea in 2013. In 2013–2014 she was the holder of the Sarton Chair of History of Science at Ghent University. She served as president of the European Society for the History of Science 2014–2016. She is the 2020 winner of the Otto Neugebauer Prize and the 2021 winner of the LMS-BSHM Hirst Prize.

Professional and academic associations
Preceded by Fabio Bevilacqua	President of the European Society for the History of Science; 2014–2016	Succeeded by Antoni Malet
