= Ina Kersten =

German mathematician

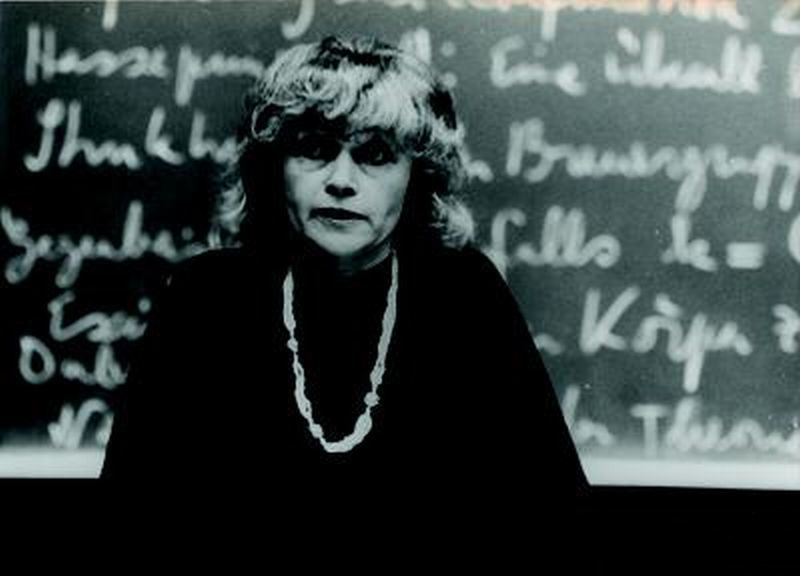
Ina Kersten at the memorial colloquium for Ernst Witt, Hamburg, 1991

Ina Kersten (born 1946) is a German mathematician and former president of the German Mathematical Society. Her research concerns abstract algebra including the theory of field extensions and algebraic groups. She is a professor emerita at the University of Göttingen.

Kersten was born in Hamburg, and earned her Ph.D. at the University of Hamburg in 1977. Her dissertation, p-Algebren über semilokalen Ringen, was supervised by Ernst Witt. She completed a habilitation at the University of Regensburg in 1983.

Kersten was president of the German Mathematical Society from 1995 to 1997, which meant she was the first woman to head the society. Under her leadership, the society founded the journal Documenta Mathematica.
