= Dictionary of Scientific Biography =

Reference work with biographies of scientists

The Dictionary of Scientific Biography is a scholarly reference work that was published from 1970 through 1980 by publisher Charles Scribner's Sons, with main editor the science historian Charles Gillispie, from Princeton University. It consisted of sixteen volumes. It is supplemented by the New Dictionary of Scientific Biography (2007). Both these publications are included in a later electronic book, called the Complete Dictionary of Scientific Biography.

== Dictionary of Scientific Biography ==
The Dictionary of Scientific Biography is a scholarly English-language reference work consisting of biographies of scientists from antiquity to modern times but excluding scientists who were alive when the Dictionary was first published. It includes scientists who worked in the areas of mathematics, physics, chemistry, biology, and earth sciences. The work is notable for being one of the most substantial reference works in the field of history of science, containing extensive biographies on hundreds of figures. It gives information about both the personal biography and in considerable detail about the scientific contributions. Engineers, physicians, social scientists and philosophers only appeared "when their work was intrinsically related to the sciences of nature or to mathematics." Though the Dictionary has worldwide coverage, the editors write that it focuses most on Western scientists, due to the limited availability of scholarship about Asian, Indian and Islamic historical scientists at the time.

The articles in the Dictionary are typically 1–5 pages and are written by eminent historians of science. All articles list a selection of the original works of the subject, as well as a comprehensive list of the secondary literature about them (which may be in any language), including early works as well as more contemporary ones.

The first volume of the Dictionary was first put out in 1970, under the general editorship of Charles Coulston Gillispie. Charles Scribner Jr., the head of Charles Scribner's Sons, initiated the discussions with Gillispie and took a special interest in it. The set was completed in 1980. The Dictionary was published in 16 volumes under the auspices of the American Council of Learned Societies by Charles Scribner's Sons with support from the National Science Foundation. Volume 15 is Supplement I; it contains additional biographies as well as topical essays on non-Western scientific traditions. Volume 16 is the general index. A 2-volume Supplement II with additional biographies was published in 1990.

In 1981, after the 16-volume set was complete, Scribner's published a one-volume abridgment, the Concise Dictionary of Scientific Biography. Its second edition was published in 2001 and includes content from the 1990 Supplement II.

In 1981, the American Library Association awarded the Dartmouth Medal to the Dictionary as a reference work of outstanding quality and significance.

In 1975, three chapters from the Dictionary of Scientific Biography were expanded and published individually in Scribner's DSB Editions series:

- I. Bernard Cohen, Benjamin Franklin: Scientist and Statesman. ISBN 0-684-14251-1
- Francis Everitt, James Clerk Maxwell: Physicist and Natural Philosopher. ISBN 0-684-14253-8
- Henry Guerlac, Antoine-Laurent Lavoisier: Chemist and Revolutionary. ISBN 0-684-14222-8

== New Dictionary of Scientific Biography ==
The New Dictionary of Scientific Biography, edited by Noretta Koertge, was published by Scribner's in December 2007 with 775 entries. Nearly 500 of these are new articles about scientists who died after 1980 and thus were not included in the original Dictionary; 75 articles are on figures from earlier periods not included in the original Dictionary of Scientific Biography, including a substantial number of female and third-world scientific figures.

== Electronic version ==
In 2007, Charles Scribner's Sons published the Complete Dictionary of Scientific Biography as an e-book. It includes the complete text of both print editions, with a unified index and other finding aids. The e-book version is available as part of the Gale Virtual Reference Library.

== Critical reception ==
The DSB has been widely praised as a monumental undertaking. One reviewer of another work wrote that "The Dictionary of Scientific Biography (DSB) has become the standard against which to measure all multi-volume biographical works in history of science." A few have noted major omissions as being a problem. Additionally, two major historians of science were omitted among the contributors, Joseph Needham and Otto Neugebauer. According to Donald Fleming, the worst account was that of J.D. Bernal by C.P. Snow, while Joseph Needham found it the most brilliant entry. According to Fernando Q. Gouvêa, the 2008 Complete Dictionary of Scientific Biography, despite some significant problems, "remains an essential resource for those interested in the lives of scientists."

== Editions ==
- Gillispie, Charles C., editor in chief. Dictionary of Scientific Biography. New York: Charles Scribner's Sons, 1970–1980. 16 vols. ISBN 0-684-10114-9. Supplement II, edited by Frederic Lawrence Holmes, 2 vols., 1990. ISBN 978-0-684-16962-0 OCLC 89822 (set).
- Concise Dictionary of Scientific Biography. American Council of Learned Societies. New York Scribner, 1981. ISBN 0-684-16650-X.
- Koertge, Noretta, editor in chief. New Dictionary of Scientific Biography. New York: Charles Scribner's Sons, 2007. 8 vols. ISBN 978-0-684-31320-7.
- Complete Dictionary of Scientific Biography. New York: Charles Scribner's Sons, 2007 [e-book]. ISBN 978-0-684-31559-1.

== Reviews ==
- Barzun, J. (1970-11-06). "Dictionary of Scientific Biography. Charles Coulston Gillispie, Ed. Vol. 1, Pierre Abailard-L. S. Berg; xiv, 626 pp., illus. Vol. 2, Hans Berger-Christoph Buys Ballot; xii, 628 pp. Scribner, New York, 1970. $35 a volume". Science. 170 (3958). American Association for the Advancement of Science (AAAS): 615–616. doi:10.1126/science.170.3958.615. ISSN 0036-8075. JSTOR 1731508.
- Krupp, E. C. (1985). "Prisoner in Disguise – A Review of: Dictionary of Scientific Biography Volume XV, Supplement I". Archaeoastronomy. 8: 142. Bibcode:1985Arch....8..142K.
- Brush, Stephen G. (1972). Gillispie, Charles Coulston (ed.). "BOOK AND FILM REVIEWS: A Facinating [sic] Reference: Dictionary of Scientific Biography". The Physics Teacher. 10 (3). American Association of Physics Teachers (AAPT): 158. doi:10.1119/1.2352143. ISSN 0031-921X.
- I. Bernard Cohen (1970). "Dictionary of Scientific Biography". The New York Times.
