= G. Waldo Dunnington =

American historian (1906–1974)

Guy Waldo Dunnington (January 15, 1906, Bowling Green, Missouri – April 10, 1974, Natchitoches, Louisiana) was a writer, historian and professor of German known for his writings on the famous German mathematician Carl Friedrich Gauss. Dunnington wrote several articles about Gauss and later a biography entitled Gauss: Titan of Science (ISBN 0-88385-547-X). He became interested in Gauss through one of his elementary school teachers, Minna Waldeck Gauss Reeves, who was a great-granddaughter of Gauss.

Dunnington was also a translator at the Nuremberg trials. He ended his teaching career at Northwestern State University, which houses his collection of Gauss-related material, believed to be the largest collection of its kind in the world. He became Dean of international students there near the end of his life.

== Bibliography ==
- Dunnington, Guy Waldo (2004) [1955]. Gray, Jeremy; Dohse, Fritz-Egbert (eds.). Carl Friedrich Gauss - Titan of Science. Spectrum series (revised ed.). Mathematical Association of America (MAA). ISBN 978-0-88385-547-8.
