= Raymond Flood (mathematician) =

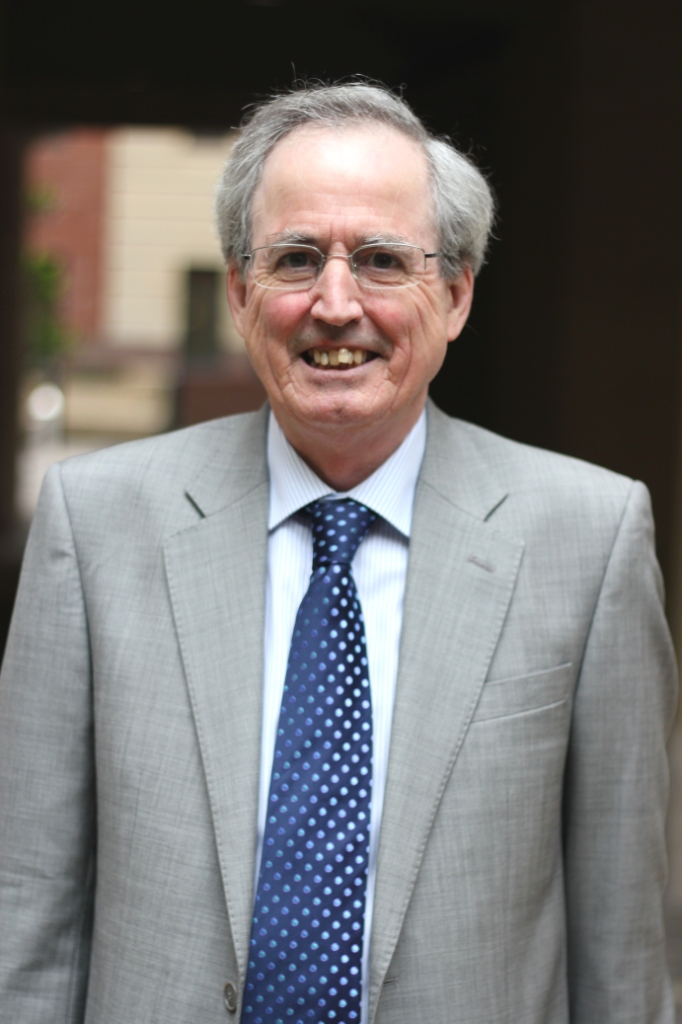
- Raymond Flood at Gresham College, 2012
- Scientific career
- Fields: Mathematics; History of mathematics Computational mathematics Theoretical Physics
- Institutions: University of Oxford; Kellogg College; Gresham College; British Society for the History of Mathematics; Committee for the History of Science, Medicine and Technology

Raymond Gerard Flood is Emeritus Fellow and a member of the Continuing Education Department at Kellogg College, Oxford, and has been a Professor of Geometry at Gresham College.

== Education ==
Flood achieved a Bachelor of Science degree at Queens University, Belfast, and a master's degree at Linacre College, Oxford. He obtained his PhD from University College, Dublin. Flood obtained his doctorate through part-time study, as he had already acquired a family and a job.

== Career ==
In 1990, Flood was made a Founding Fellow of Kellogg College, Oxford, formally Rewley House. Kellogg College, Oxford was created to look after the interests of mature and part-time students. Flood primarily teaches those students who are either mature, or who study part-time. He has held numerous positions at the College and the University of Oxford, including Curator of the University Libraries and as a University lecturer at the University of Oxford.

Flood has dedicated much of his academic career promoting mathematics and computing to adult audiences. He has been President of the British Society for the History of Mathematics from 2006 until 2009, and also Research Associate in the School of Theoretical Physics, Dublin Institute for Advanced Studies. On Gresham College, Flood has said "Gresham College comes from a long tradition of liberal adult education. Allowing people from a variety of backgrounds... to get access to current thinking on the major issues of the day. Gresham College ethos is very similar to my own ethos"

In August 2012, Flood was appointed Gresham Professor of Geometry at Gresham College for a period of three years, replacing John D. Barrow. During his term at the College he delivered series of free public lectures on Shaping Modern Mathematics, Applying Modern Mathematics, and Great Mathematicians, Great Mathematics.

== Other research work and publications ==
Aside from his academic work, Flood is active in communicating mathematics and its history to non-specialist audiences. He has appeared on BBC Radio 4's In Our Time and has lectured on transatlantic voyages with RMS Queen Mary 2.

Flood has produced and co-produced many publications and books on mathematics. Some of the most recent books with which he has been involved are James Clerk Maxwell: Perspectives on his Life and Work (Oxford University Press, 2014), The Great Mathematicians (Arcturus, 2011), and Mathematics in Victorian Britain (Oxford University Press, 2011).
