= Umberto Bottazzini =

Italian historian of mathematics

Umberto Bottazzini (born 1947 in Viadana, Lombardy) is an Italian historian of mathematics, writing on the history of mathematics and the foundations of mathematics.

== Biography ==
Bottazzini graduated in 1973 with the Laurea degree from the University of Milan. He was an associate professor of matematiche complementari (an Italian academic discipline involving the history of mathematics, foundations of mathematics, and mathematical didactics) from 1977 to 1979 at the University of Calabria and from 1979 to 1990 at the University of Bologna. From 1990 to 2004 he was a professor ordinarius in the department of mathematics and computer science at the University of Palermo. He was for the academic year 1995–1996 a resident fellow at MIT's Dibner Institute for the History of Science and Technology. From 1996 to 1999 he was a fellow of the interdisciplinary Research Center Beniamino Segre of Rome's Accademia dei Lincei. From 2002 to 2006 he was a lecturer in the history of science at Trieste's Scuola Internazionale Superiore di Studi Avanzati (SISSA), where he still maintains collaborative relations. From 2003 to 2004 he also taught at Milan's Vita-Salute San Raffaele University. Since 2004 he is a professor ordinarius of matematiche complementari at the University of Milan.

Bottazzini's research deals with the development of mathematical analysis in the 19th century, especially the work of Bernhard Riemann, Augustin-Louis Cauchy, and Karl Weierstrass. Bottazzini was the editor, with added commentary, for a new edition of Cauchy's Cours d'analyse; the new edition was published in Bologna in 1990 by CLUEB (Cooperativa Libraria Universitaria Editrice Bologna).

For more than twenty-five years he contributed the Sunday Supplement of the Italian newspaper Il Sole 24 Ore with a column on mathematical subjects, and for this activity in 2006 he was awarded the Pitagora Prize from the town of Crotone for the popularization of mathematics.

He has a wife and son. Among his students are Rossana Tazzioli and Alberto Cogliati.

== Awards and honors ==
- 1993 — Corresponding Member of the International Academy for the History of Sciences
- 2002 — Invited Speaker at the International Congress of Mathematicians (ICM) in Beijing
- 2012 — Fellow of the American Mathematical Society
- 2015 — Albert Leon Whiteman Memorial Prize

== Selected publications ==
- Bottazzini, Umberto (1977). "Le funzioni a periodi multipli nella corrispondenza tra Hermite e Casorati". Archive for History of Exact Sciences. 18 (1): 39–88. doi:10.1007/BF00350459. JSTOR 41133499. S2CID 120221569.
- The Higher Calculus. A History of Real and Complex Analysis from Euler to Weierstrass, Springer 1981, 1986; Italian original Il calcolo sublime, Boringhieri 1981
- Bottazzini, Umberto (1989). "Lagrange et le problème de Kepler". Revue d'Histoire des Sciences. 42 (1/2): 27–42. doi:10.3406/rhs.1989.4133. JSTOR 23633024.
- Va' pensiero. Immagini della matematica nell'Italia dell'Ottocento, Società editrice Il Mulino, Bologna, 1994.
- Riposte armonie. Lettere di Federigo Enriques a Guido Castelnuovo, edited by Umberto Bottazzini, Alberto Conte & Paola Gario, Bollati Boringhieri Editore, Torino, 1996. (See Federigo Enriques & Guido Castelnuovo.)
- Poincaré, book series: "I grandi della scienza", Quaderni de "Le Scienze", Milano, 1999 (translated by Laurent Rollet into French, published 2000, Paris, Pour la Science (collection Les Génies de la Science, Num. 4); translated by Jan Willem Nienhuys into Dutch 2013). (See Henri Poincaré.)
- Die Theorie der komplexen Funktionen 1780–1900, in: Hans Niels Jahnke (ed.): Geschichte der Analysis, Spektrum Verlag, 1999, pp. 267–328; translated in English, as: "Complex function theory, 1780–1900." in: A history of analysis (2003): 213–259.
- with Edoardo Boncinelli: La serva padrona. Fascino e potere della matematica, Mailand, Cortina 2000
- as editor with Amy Dalhan Dalmedico: Changing Images of Mathematics – From the French Revolution to the New Millennium, Rutledge 2001
- Guido Castelnuovo, Opere matematiche. Memorie e Note, edited by Edoardo Vesentini, Enrico Arbarello, Umberto Bottazzini, Maurizio Cornalba & Paola Gario, vol. I (2002), vol. II (2003), vol. III (2004), vol. IV (2007), Pubblicazioni a cura dell'Accademia Nazionale dei Lincei, Roma, 2002–2007.
- with Elena Anne Marchisotto & Patrizia Miller: Hilbert's Flute – the History of Modern Mathematics, Springer 2006, ISBN 0387986952, Italian original 2003
- with Jeremy Gray: Chapter 5 Riemann's Geometry Function Theory in Hidden Harmony – Geometric Fantasies. The rise of complex function theory, Springer 2013 doi:10.1007/978-1-4614-5725-1_6
- with Pietro Nastasi: La Patria ci Vuole Eroi: Matematici e Vita Politica Nell’Italia del Risorgimento (Zanichelli, Turin, Italy, 2013)
- Numeri. Raccontare la matematica, Società editrice il Mulino, Bologna, 2015.
