= Catherine Goldstein =

French mathematician and historian of mathematics

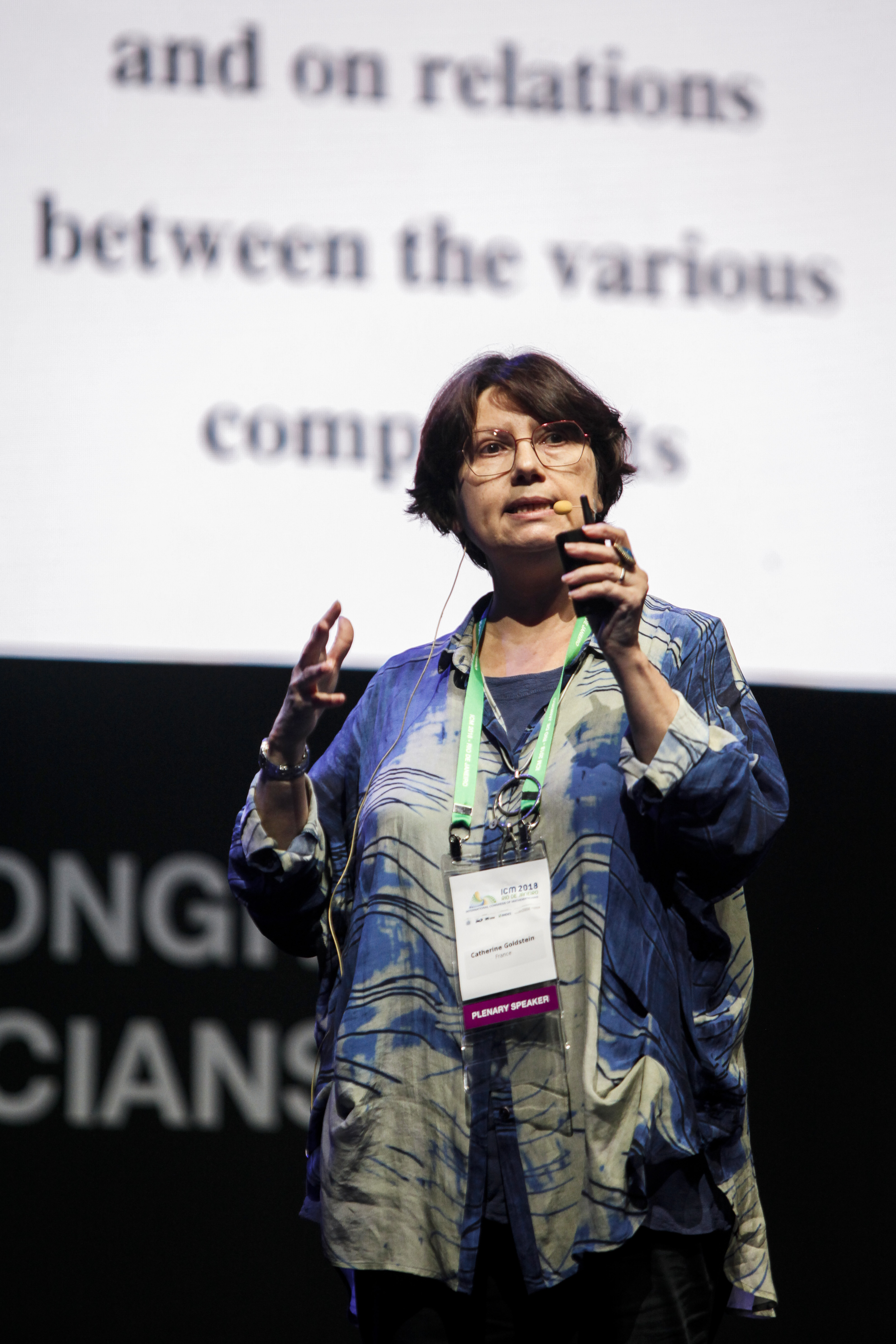
Goldstein at the ICM 2018

Catherine Goldstein (born July 5, 1958 in Paris) is a French number theorist and historian of mathematics who works as a director of research at the Institut de mathématiques de Jussieu (IMJ). She was president of L'association femmes et mathématiques in 1991.

== Education and career ==
Goldstein studied at the Ecole normale supérieure from 1976 to 1980, earning an agrégation in mathematics in 1978. She completed a doctorate of the third cycle in 1981, with a dissertation on p-adic L-functions and Iwasawa theory supervised by John H. Coates.

She worked at the University of Paris-Sud from 1980 until 2002, when she moved to IMJ.

== Contributions and recognition ==
Goldstein has been listed as one of the plenary speakers at the 2018 International Congress of Mathematicians. With Norbert Schappacher and Joachim Schwermer, she is editor of the book The shaping of arithmetic after C. F. Gauss's Disquisitiones arithmeticae.
