= June Barrow-Green =

British mathematician and historian of mathematics

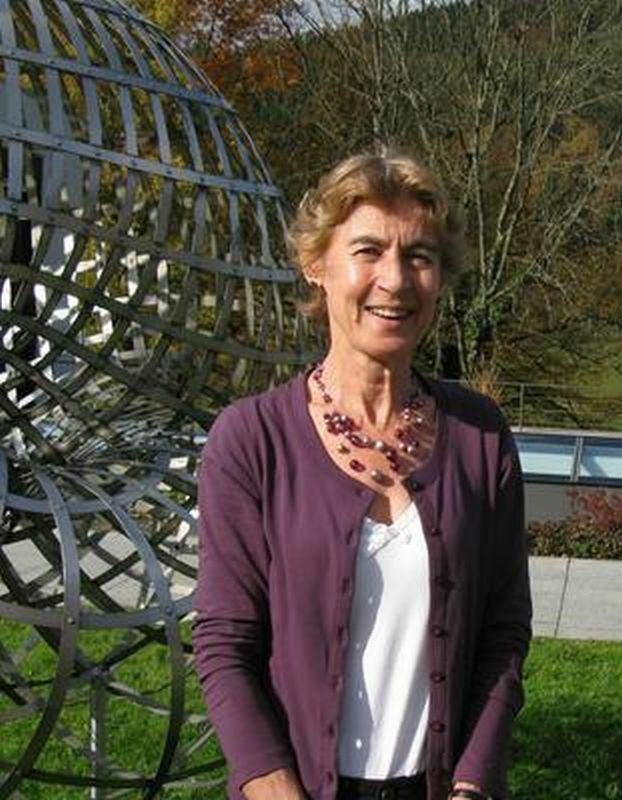
June Barrow-Green, Oberwolfach 2011.

June Barrow-Green (born 1953) is a professor of History of Mathematics at the Open University and a visiting professor at the London School of Economics.

== Education ==
Barrow-Green obtained a BSc Hons in Mathematics in 1986 and an MSc in Mathematical Physics in 1989, both from King's College London. In 1993 she gained a PhD in mathematics from the Open University, under supervision of Jeremy Gray, on Poincaré and the Three Body Problem.

== Career ==
From 1993 to the present Barrow-Green has worked at the Open University, receiving a professorship in 2015.

From 2003 to 2005 she was president of the British Society for the History of Mathematics. From 2007 to 2018 she was an elected member of the Council of the London Mathematical Society and during that period she served as the Librarian for the society.

In 2014 Barrow-Green was awarded the first Chandler Davis Prize for Expository Excellence for her article An American Goes to Europe: Three Letters from Oswald Veblen to George Birkhoff in 1913/1914 in The Mathematical Intelligencer.

In 2018 she took part in a discussion panel on The Gender Gap in Mathematical and Natural Sciences from a Historical Perspective at the International Congress of Mathematicians 2018, Rio de Janeiro, which was chaired by the English mathematician Caroline Series and also featured the French mathematician Marie-Françoise Roy and the Argentine physicist Silvina Ponce Dawson.

She chairs the executive committee of the International Commission on the History of Mathematics.

In August 2021 The Royal Society awarded her its Wilkins-Bernal-Medawar medal "for her research in 19th & 20th century mathematics, with emphasis on the underrepresentation of women in historical narratives & contemporary mathematics".

== Selected publications ==
- Barrow-Green, June; Gray, Jeremy; Wilson, Robin (2019), The History of Mathematics: A Source-Based Approach: Volume 1, American Mathematical Society & Mathematical Association of America
- Gowers, Timothy; Barrow-Green, June; Leader, Imre, eds. (2008), The Princeton Companion to Mathematics, Princeton University Press
- Barrow-Green, June (2002), Poincaré and the discovery of chaos, Icon, ISBN 9781840462883
- Barrow-Green, June (1997), Poincaré and the three body problem, History of mathematics, v. 11., American Mathematical Society, ISBN 9780821803677
