= Norbert Schappacher =

German mathematician and historian of mathematics

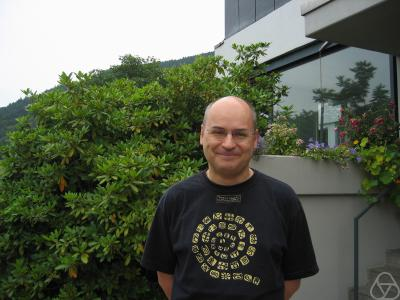
Schappacher at Oberwolfach, 2004

Norbert Schappacher (born 8 October 1950 in Essen) is a German mathematician and historian of mathematics. He was an Invited Speaker at the International Congress of Mathematicians in 2010 in Hyderabad.

== Education and career ==
After secondary education at Essen's Burggymnasium, Schappacher studied from 1969 to 1971 at the University of Bonn, where he was taught by (among others) Günter Harder and Friedrich Hirzebruch. Schappacher obtained his Vordiplom in 1971 at the University of Göttingen, where he studied from 1971 to 1974 and was taught by (among others) Hans Grauert, Ulrich Stuhler, and Martin Kneser. For the academic year 1974–1975, Schappacher studied as an exchange student at the University of California, Berkeley, where his teachers included Tsit Yuen Lam and Robin Hartshorne. At the University of Göttingen, Schappacher received his Diplom in 1975 and from 1977 to 1986 held the position of assistant at the Göttingen Mathematical Institute. There in 1978 he received his doctorate with advisor Martin Kneser and thesis Eine diophantische Invariante von Singularitäten über nichtarchimedischen Körpern (A diophantine invariant of singularities over non-Archimedean fields).

He was from 1979 to 1981 at Paris-Sud University (University of Paris XI) in Orsay with John H. Coates and for the academic year 1983–1984 at the Max-Planck-Institut für Mathematik (MPI) in Bonn with Günter Harder. Schappacher in 1985 was an assistant professor (Professeur associé) at Paris-Sud University and habilitated in 1986 at the University of Göttingen with thesis Periods of Hecke operators. He was in 1986 at the Mathematical Sciences Research Institute (MSRI) in Berkeley, then worked in 1987 as an assistant professor in Orsay and was from 1987 to 1991 a Heisenberg fellow at the MPI in Bonn. He was at the Institute for Advanced Study for five months in 1990.

Schappacher is since 1991 a professor at the University of Strasbourg. From 2002 to 2004 he was a visiting professor at TU Darmstadt and returned in 2004 to the University of Strasbourg. He has held visiting positions at several academic institutions, including the Isaac Newton Institute (for 2 months in 1997), Mumbai's Tata Institute of Fundamental Research (for 2 months in 2000–2001), and the Akademie der Wissenschaften zu Göttingen (as Gauss-Professor in summer 2007). In 2011–2012 he was a Fellow of Lichtenberg-Kolleg, Göttingen.

Schappacher's research is primarily on number theory, arithmetic geometry, and the history of mathematics. He has done research on the history of mathematics in Germany during the era of National Socialism (including Edmund Landau, Oswald Teichmüller and the Mathematical Institute in Göttingen), as well as historical research on Kurt Heegner, Bartel Leendert van der Waerden, Diophantus of Alexandria, and Leonhard Euler. Since 2008 Schappacher is a member of the Euler Committee of the Swiss Academy of Sciences. He was from 2009 to 2016 editor-in-chief of the Revue d'histoire des mathématiques and is the managing editor of the Elemente der Mathematik.

In 2011 he was elected a corresponding member of the Akademie der Wissenschaften zu Göttingen.

== Selected publications ==
=== Articles ===
- with Günter Harder in: Hirzebruch F.; Schwermer J.; Suter S., eds. (1985). "Special values of Hecke L-functions and abelian integrals by G. Harder and N. Schappacher". Arbeitstagung Bonn 1984. Lecture Notes in Mathematics, vol 1111. Berlin; Heidelberg: Springer. pp. 17–49. doi:10.1007/BFb0084583.
- with Martin Kneser: Fachverband – Institut – Staat. Streiflichter auf das Verhältnis von Mathematik zu Gesellschaft und Politik in Deutschland seit 1890 unter besonderer Berücksichtigung der Zeit des Nationalsozialismus. In: Gerd Fischer, Friedrich Hirzebruch, Winfried Scharlau, Willi Törnig (eds.): Ein Jahrhundert Mathematik 1890-1990. Festschrift zum Jubiläum der DMV. Vieweg, Braunschweig 1990, ISBN 3-528-06326-2 (Dokumente zur Geschichte der Mathematik 6), pp. 1–82
- On the history of Hilbert's twelfth problem, in: Michele Audin (ed.), Matériaux pour l'histoire des mathématiques au XXe siècle Actes du colloque à la mémoire de Jean Dieudonné (Nice 1996), SMF 1998
- Das Mathematische Institut der Universität Göttingen 1929–1950 in Heinrich Becker, Hans-Joachim Dahms, Cornelia Wegener (eds.): Die Universität Göttingen unter dem Nationalsozialismus (2nd expanded edition), K. G. Saur, München 1998, pp. 523–551 (More detailed typescript from 1983 in a new version from April 2000 online)
- "Chapter 54. David Hilbert, report on algebraic number fields ('Zahlbericht') (1897) by Norbert Schappacher". Landmark Writings in Western Mathematics 1640-1940. 2005. pp. 700–709. doi:10.1016/B978-044450871-3/50135-2.
- "Seventy years ago: The Bourbaki Congress at El Escorial and other mathematical (non) events of 1936." In The Mathematical Intelligencer, Special issue International Congress of Mathematicians Madrid August, pp. 8–15. 2006.
- Begehr, H.; Koch, H.; Kramer, J.; Schappacher, N.; Thiele, E.-J., eds. (6 December 2012). "Gotthold Eisenstein by Norbert Schappacher". Mathematics in Berlin. Birkhäuser. pp. 55–60. ISBN 978-3-0348-8787-8.

=== Books ===
- Periods of Hecke characters, Springer-Verlag, Berlin 1988, ISBN 3-540-18915-7 (Lecture Notes in Mathematics 1301); 2006 reprint
- as editor, with Michael Rapoport and Peter Schneider: Beilinson’s conjectures on special values of L-functions, Academic Press, Boston 1988, ISBN 0-12-581120-9 (Oberwolfach-Tagung; Perspectives in Mathematics 4); 2014 reprint
- as editor, with Alexander Reznikov: Regulators in analysis, geometry and number theory, Birkhäuser, Basel 2000, ISBN 3-7643-4115-7 (Progress in Mathematics 171); 2012 reprint
- as editor, with Catherine Goldstein, Joachim Schwermer: The shaping of arithmetic after C. F. Gauss’s Disquisitiones Arithmeticae. Springer-Verlag, Berlin 2007, ISBN 978-3-540-20441-1
- as editor, with Heinrich Begehr, Helmut Koch, Jürg Kramer, and Ernst-Jochen Thiele: Mathematics in Berlin. Birkhäuser. 2012. ISBN 9783034887878.
