= Jeremy Gray (mathematician) =

English mathematician (born 1947)

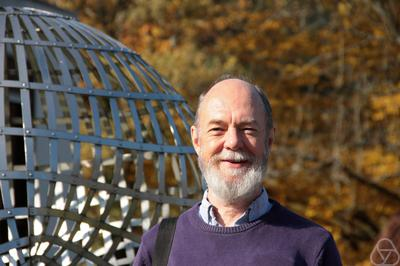
- Gray at Oberwolfach in 2015
- Born: 25 April 1947 (age 79)
- Scientific career
- Workplaces: Open University; University of Warwick
- Doctoral advisor: Ian Stewart and David Fowler
- Doctoral students: June Barrow-Green, Snezana Lawrence

Jeremy John Gray (born 25 April 1947) is an English mathematician primarily interested in the history of mathematics.

== Biography ==
Gray studied mathematics at the University of Oxford from 1966 to 1969, and then at Warwick University, obtaining his PhD in 1980 under the supervision of Ian Stewart and David Fowler. He has worked at the Open University since 1974, and became a lecturer there in 1978. He also lectured at the University of Warwick from 2002 to 2017, teaching a course on the history of mathematics.

Gray was a consultant on the television series, The Story of Maths, a co-production between the Open University and the BBC. He edits Archive for History of Exact Sciences.

In 1998 he was an Invited Speaker of the International Congress of Mathematicians in Berlin. In 2012 he became a fellow of the American Mathematical Society.

== Books ==
Gray has been awarded prizes for his contributions to mathematics, including the Albert Leon Whiteman Memorial Prize from the American Mathematical Society in 2009, the Otto Neugebauer Prize of the European Mathematical Society in 2016, and the London Mathematical Society's Hirst Prize and Lectureship in 2018.

He has authored the following:

- Ideas of space: Euclidean, non-Euclidean, and relativistic. Oxford University Press 1979, 2nd edition 1989, Spanish edition, Ideas de Espacio, Mondadori Espana, 1992. Romanian edition, Idei Spatiu, Editura All Educational, 1998.
- Linear differential equations and group theory from Riemann to Poincaré Birkhäuser, 1986, 2nd edition with three new appendices and other additional material, 2000, Japanese edition 2002.
- The Geometrical Work of Girard Desargues (with J. V. Field). Springer 1986. Field, Judith V.; Gray, Jeremy (6 December 2012). 2012 pbk edition. Springer. ISBN 978-1-4613-8694-0.
- Geometry (with D.A. Brannan and M. Esplen). Cambridge University Press 1999, 2nd edition 2012, Arabic edition 2001.
- The Hilbert Challenge. Oxford University Press 2000, French translation Le défi de Hilbert Dunod, 2003, Taiwanese translation 2003, Spanish translation El reto de Hilbert Critica, 2004.
- János Bolyai, non-Euclidean Geometry and the Nature of Space. Burndy Library, MIT, 2004.
- Worlds out of Nothing; A Course on the History of Geometry in the 19th Century. Springer 2006, 2nd revised edition 2010.
- Plato’s Ghost: The Modernist Transformation of Mathematics. Princeton University Press 2008. ISBN 9780691136103
- Henri Poincaré: a scientific biography. Princeton University Press 2012.
- Hidden Harmony – Geometric Fantasies. The Rise of Complex Function Theory (with Umberto Bottazzini). Springer 2013.
- The Real and the Complex: A History of Analysis in the 19th Century. Springer 2015.
- A History of Abstract Algebra: From Algebraic Equations to Modern Algebra. Springer 2018.
- Change and Variations: A History of Differential Equations to 1900. Springer 2021.

Books edited or co-edited:

- The History of Mathematics; a Reader (with John Fauvel). Macmillan 1987.
- L'Europe mathématique, Mathematical Europe (with C. Goldstein and J. Ritter). Edited with an introductory essay, Éditions de la maison des sciences de l'homme, Paris 1996.
- Henri Poincaré: Three Supplementary Essays on the Discovery of Fuchsian Functions (with Scott Walter) Edited with an introductory essay, Akademie Verlag and Blanchard 1997.
- The symbolic universe: geometry and physics, 1890-1930. Edited with an introduction and an essay, Oxford University Press 1999.
- Jacques Hadamard: Non-Euclidean Geometry in the Theory of Automorphic Functions (with Abe Shenitzer), translated Abe Shenitzer with an introductory essay by J.J. Gray, American and London Mathematical Societies Series in the History of Mathematics, HMath17, 1999.
- Mathematical Conversations; Selections from the Mathematical Intelligencer (with Robin Wilson) Springer 2000. There is also a Japanese edition.
- Gauss − Titan of Science. A re-edition of G. Waldo Dunnington's book of 1956, with a new introduction and appendices by J.J. Gray, Mathematical Association of America, 2003.
- The Architecture of Modern Mathematics. Edited volume, with an essay by J.J. Gray and one with the co-editor, José Ferreirós, Oxford University Press 2006.
- Episodes in the History of Modern Algebra 1800—1950. Edited volume, with an introduction by J.J. Gray and the co-editor, Karen Parshall, American and London Mathematical Societies Series in the History of Mathematics, HMath32, 2007.

He has also contributed to other books:

- The Princeton Companion to Mathematics
- The Oxford Handbook of the History of Mathematics
- Revolutions in Mathematics
