= Karen Parshall =

American historian of mathematics

Karen Hunger Parshall (born 1955, Virginia; née Karen Virginia Hunger) is an American historian of mathematics. She is the Commonwealth Professor of History and Mathematics at the University of Virginia with a joint appointment in the Corcoran Department of History and Department of Mathematics. From 2009 to 2012, Parshall was the Associate Dean for the Social Sciences in the College of Arts in Sciences at UVA, and from 2016 to 2019 she was the chair of the Corcoran Department of History.

== Education and career ==
Parshall double-majored in French and mathematics at the University of Virginia, where she earned her master's degree in mathematics in 1978. She earned her PhD in 1982 in history from the University of Chicago under the direction of the historian Allen G. Debus (1926–2009) and the mathematician Israel Herstein. The subject of her dissertation was the history of the theory of algebras, especially the work of Joseph Wedderburn (The contributions of J. H. M. Wedderburn to the theory of algebras, 1900–1910).

From 1982 to 1987, Parshall was an assistant professor at Sweet Briar College and in 1987/88 at the University of Illinois at Urbana-Champaign. Since 1988 she has taught mathematics, the history of mathematics, and the history of science at the University of Virginia, where she became in 1988 an assistant professor, in 1993 an associate professor and in 1999 a professor. She was a visiting professor at the Australian National University in Canberra, at the École des Hautes Etudes en Sciences Sociales (1985 and 2010) and at the Pierre and Marie Curie University in Paris (2016).

== Work ==
Parshall's academic specialty is the development of mathematics in the US in the late 19th century and early 20th century (particularly the Chicago School). As one example, she has studied the work of Leonard Dickson, who was greatly influenced by contact with German mathematicians such as Felix Klein at the time of the Columbian Exposition of 1893. She has also focused on the history of algebra. She edited the correspondence of James Joseph Sylvester published by Oxford University Press and wrote a biography of Sylvester.

== Recognition ==
In the academic year 1996/97 Parshall was a Guggenheim Fellow. In 1994 she was an invited speaker at the International Congress of Mathematicians (ICM) in Zürich (Mathematics in National Contexts (1875–1900): An International Overview). Since 2002 she has been a corresponding member of the Académie internationale d’histoire des sciences in Paris. From 1996 to 1999, she was editor of the journal Historia Mathematica. Parshall was in the governing body of the History of Science Society and from 1998 to 2001 of the American Mathematical Society (AMS).

In 2012, she became an inaugural fellow of the American Mathematical Society. She is the 2018 winner of the Albert Leon Whiteman Memorial Prize of the American Mathematical Society "for her outstanding work in the history of mathematics, and in particular, for her work on the evolution of mathematics in the US and on the history of algebra, as well as for her substantial contribution to the international life of her discipline through students, editorial work, and conferences."

In 2020, she was elected Fellow of the American Association for the Advancement of Science, in the Section on Mathematics.

Parshall is also a former AMS Council member at large.

== Works ==
- Eliakim Hastings Moore and the Founding of a Mathematical Community in America, 1892–1902, Annals of Science 41, 1984, pp. 313–333; also reprinted in Peter Duren (ed.): A Century of Mathematics in America. Part II, AMS History of Mathematics 2, Providence 1989, pp. 155–175 (by AMS Books Online: Part entitled Chicago)
- Joseph H. M. Wedderburn and the Structure Theory of Algebras, Archive for History of Exact Sciences 32, 1985, pp. 223–349
- The Art of Algebra from al-Khwarizmi to Viète: a Study in the Natural Selection of Ideas, History of Science 26, 1988, pp. 129–164
- Toward a History of Nineteenth-Century Invariant Theory, in David E. Rowe, John McCleary (eds.): The History of Modern Mathematics Vol. 1, Academic Press, Boston 1989, pp. 157–206
- with David E. Rowe: American Mathematics Comes of Age: 1875–1900, in Peter Duren (ed.): A Century of Mathematics in America. Part III, AMS History of Mathematics 3, 1989, pp. 3–28 (bei AMS Books Online: Part entitled The Nineteenth Century; from Google Books)
- with David E. Rowe: The Emergence of the American Mathematical Research Community 1876–1900: J. J. Sylvester, Felix Klein, and E. H. Moore, AMS/LMS History of Mathematics 8, Providence/London 1994
- James Joseph Sylvester: Life and Work in Letters, Oxford University Press, 1998
- with Adrian C. Rice (eds.): Mathematics Unbound: The Evolution of an International Mathematical Research Community, 1800–1945, AMS/LMS History of Mathematics 23, 2002
- with Jeremy J. Gray (eds.): Episodes in the History of Modern Algebra (1800–1950), AMS/LMS History of Mathematics 32, Providence/London 2007 (Conference at MSRI 2002)
- 2000: Perspectives on American Mathematics, Bulletin of the American Mathematical Society 37: 381–405.
- 2006: James Joseph Sylvester: Jewish Mathematician in a Victorian World, Johns Hopkins University Press, ISBN 0-8018-8291-5
- 2014: with Victor J. Katz: Taming the Unknown: History of algebra from antiquity to the early twentieth century, Princeton University Press ISBN 9780691149059.

== Sources ==
- Florence Fasanelli: Karen Parshall. In: Charlene Morrow, Teri Perl (eds.): Notable women in mathematics. A biographical Dictionary. Greenwood Publishing Group, Westport CT, 1998, ISBN 0-313-29131-4, pp. 157–160.
