= List of things named after Felix Klein =

These are things named after Felix Klein (1849–1925), a German mathematician.

== Mathematics ==
- Klein bottle
  - Solid Klein bottle
- Klein configuration
- Klein cubic threefold
- Klein four-group
- Klein geometry
- Klein graphs
- Klein's inequality
- Klein model
- Klein polyhedron
- Klein surface
- Klein quadric
- Klein quartic
- Kleinian group
- Kleinian integer
- Kleinian model
- Kleinian ring
- Kleinian singularity
- Klein's icosahedral cubic surface
- Klein's j-invariant
- Beltrami–Klein model
- Cayley–Klein metric
- Clifford–Klein form
- Schottky–Klein prime form

== Other ==
- Klein's Encyclopedia of Mathematical Sciences
- The Felix Klein Protocols
- Felix Klein medal, named after the first president of the ICMI (1908–1920), honours a lifetime achievement in mathematics education research.
- The Klein project of the IMU and ICMI aims to produce a book for upper secondary teachers that communicates the breadth and vitality of the research discipline of mathematics and connects it to the senior secondary school curriculum.
