= Adolphe Buhl =

French mathematician and astronomer (1878–1949)

- Born: 19 June 1878; Paris, France
- Died: 24 March 1949 (aged 70); Viry-Châtillon, France
- Citizenship: France
- Scientific career
- Fields: Mathematics, astronomy
- Thesis: Sur les équations différentielles simultanées et la forme aux dérivées partielles adjointe (1901)

Adolphe Buhl (19 June 1878, in Paris – 24 March 1949, in Viry-Châtillon, Seine-et-Oise) was a French mathematician and astronomer.

== Biography ==
At the age of 14, he was paralyzed, immobilizing him for a few years and forcing him to walk on crutches all his life. He became interested in mathematics and reached a high level of expertise as a self-taught mathematician. He obtained a PhD in 1901 at the Faculty of Sciences of the University of Paris with thesis Sur les équations différentielles simultanées et la forme aux dérivées partielles adjointe and with second thesis La théorie de Delaunay sur le mouvement de la lune. The thesis committee was composed of Gaston Darboux, Henri Poincaré and Paul Appell.

Adolphe Buhl began his teaching career in 1903 as a maître de conférences (senior lecturer) in astronomy at the Faculty of Sciences of the University of Montpellier. In 1909, he was appointed professor at the Faculty of Sciences of the University of Toulouse, first in the professorial chair of rational mechanics then in the chair of differential and integral calculus, which he occupied until his retirement in October 1945.

From 1903, he was an editor for the Swiss journal L'Enseignement Mathématique; in 1920 he succeeded Charles-Ange Laisant and participated with Henri Fehr as co-editors-in-chief of the journal. From 1930, he participated as editorial committee secretary to the editor-in-chief of the Annales de la Faculté des Sciences de Toulouse.

Adolphe Buhl published numerous articles in mathematical analysis, geometry, and theoretical physics. His lectures given at the Faculty of Sciences of Toulouse were published.

He was an Invited Speaker of the ICM in 1928 in Bologna. He was awarded the Ordre national de la Légion d'honneur.

== Selected publications ==
=== Articles ===
- "Sur les surfaces dont un système de lignes asymptotiques se projette suivant une famille de courbes données." Bulletin de la Société Mathématique de France 31 (1903): 47–54.
- "Sur les équations linéaires aux dérivées partielles et la théorie des groupes continus." Journal de Mathématiques Pures et Appliquées (1904): 85–130.
- "Sur la formule de Stokes dans l'hyperespace." Annales de la Faculté des Sciences de Toulouse: Mathématiques 3 (1911): pp. 63–72.
- "Sur la représentation des fonctions mésomorphes." Acta Mathematica 35, no. 1 (1912): 73–95. doi:10.1007/BF02418814
- "Sur les transformations et extensions de la formule de Stokes." Annales de la Faculté des Sciences de Toulouse: Mathématiques 4 (1912): pp. 365–410.
- "Sur les volumes tournants." Nouvelles Annales de Mathématiques: Journal des Candidats aux Écoles Polytechnique et Normale 2 (1923): 374–377.
- "Lignes asymptotiques et lignes de courbure." Journal de Mathématiques pures et appliquées 8 (1929): 45–70.
- "Sur les formules fondamentales de l'électromagnétisme et de la gravifique." Annales de la Faculté des Sciences de Toulouse: Mathématiques 19 (1927): pp. 1–38.
- "Tourbillons corpuscules, ondes avec quelques préliminaires sur le rôle des opérateurs en physique théorique." Annales de la Faculté des Sciences de Toulouse: Mathématiques 24 (1932): pp. 1–48.

=== Books ===
- Sur les équations différentielles simultanées et la forme aux dérivées partielles adjointe. C. Naud. 1901.
- Géométrie et analyse des intégrales doubles. Scientia. 1920. Phys.-mathématiqueno 36. Gauthier-Villars. 1920.
- Buhl, A. (1925). Séries Analytiques. Sommabilité. Gauthier-Villars.
- Buhl, A. (1926). Formules stokiennes. Gauthier-Villars.
- Buhl, A. (1928). Aperçus modernes sur la théorie des groupes continus et finis. Gauthier-Villars.
- Buhl, A. (1934). Gravifiques, groupes, mécaniques. Gauthier-Villars.
- Nouveaux Éléments d'Analyse. Calcul Infinitésimal. Géométrie. Physique Théorique, tome 1: Variables réelles. Gauthier-Villars. 1937. tome 2: Variables complexes. 1938. tome 3: Équations différentielles. 1940. tome 4: Équations aux dérivées partielles. 1943.
