= Felix Klein and Sophus Lie =

1988 non-fiction book by I. M. Yaglom

Felix Klein and Sophus Lie: Evolution of the Idea of Symmetry in the Nineteenth Century
- Author: I. M. Yaglom
- Original title: Феликс Клейн и Софус Ли
- Translator: Sergei Sossinsky
- Language: English
- Subject: History of mathematics, Symmetry
- Published: 1988
- Publisher: Birkhäuser
- Publication date: 1977 (Russian original)
- English publication date: 1988
- Media type: Book
- Pages: 237
- ISBN: 0-8176-3316-2

Felix Klein and Sophus Lie: Evolution of the Idea of Symmetry in the Nineteenth Century is a 1988 book by I. M. Yaglom, translated from the Russian into English by Sergei Sossinsky, on the history of the notion of symmetry and the mathematical works of Felix Klein and Sophus Lie besides other mathematicians, such as Camille Jordan, without focusing on biographical details, but on their ideas. It was published by Birkhäuser.

== Editions ==
The original Russian edition of the book was published in 1977 and translated into English by Sergei Sossinky and edited by Hardy Grant and Abe Shenitzer in 1988. In 2009, the book was republished by Ishi Press as Geometries, Groups and Algebras in the Nineteenth Century. The new edition, designed by Sam Sloan, has a foreword by Richard Bozulich.

== Contents ==
Felix Klein and Sophus Lie examines the evolution of mathematical ideas that converged in Klein and Lie's work. Yaglom based the work on his lectures to graduate-level students at Yaroslavl State University; Douglas Quadling described it as "a sharply-focused (though appropriately discursive) study" rather than "a catalogue of names and dates." The book begins with Camille Jordan, who discovers an unanswered letter from Galois among Cauchy's papers. This discovery leads Jordan to become the principal advocate of group theory. When Klein and Lie set off for Paris in 1870 to meet Jordan, their visit is cut short by the Franco-Prussian War, but it proves long enough to direct both mathematicians toward the applications of group theory that would define their careers.

The book's central chapters trace three major developments in nineteenth-century geometry: projective geometry, non-Euclidean geometries, and multidimensional spaces. During this period, the scene was dominated by figures like Carl Friedrich Gauss, who attended a lecture by Bernhard Riemann on geometry at age 77, where the ideas presented were "so far ahead of their time that only Gauss could have understood them." Other prominent names include August Ferdinand Möbius, Jakob Steiner, János Bolyai, Nikolai Lobachevsky, Arthur Cayley, Hermann Grassmann, and William Rowan Hamilton.

Alongside the main text runs an extensive apparatus of 312 footnotes that occupy nearly as much space as the main story. These notes provide additional mathematical detail, biographical information about minor contributors, and discussions of deeper philosophical issues.

== Reception ==
Douglas Quadling praised Felix Klein and Sophus Lie as "a work of considerable scholarship" that "tells a fascinating story in a style which consistently commands attention" and recommended it to mathematics teachers and advanced students. Quadling suggested that the book could serve as a natural sequel to E. T. Bell's popular Men of Mathematics.

Ed Barbeau found the work both informative and frustrating. While acknowledging it as "a 'good read'" and "a useful source of succinct accounts of the principal developments of nineteenth century geometry," he was disappointed by the book's failure to maintain focus on its stated theme. Barbeau wrote that the thread of symmetry gets lost in "the wealth of material" and disappears for "large tracts of the book" only to be "quickly dissolved into a discussion of group theory" when it does appear.

David Rowe delivered the harshest assessment, particularly regarding Yaglom's historical methodology. Rowe wrote that "many of the standard weaknesses found in historical studies undertaken by mathematicians," with interpretations that appear "based on a combination of folklore, conjecture, and superficial reading of popular (and sometimes notoriously unreliable) secondary work." Despite this, Rowe acknowledged the book's value "as a popular introduction to the historical role of symmetry in modern mathematics."

The absence of an index was criticized by both Barbeau and Quadling.

== Original version ==
- Феликс Клейн и Софус Ли. (1977).

== See also ==
- Vorlesungen über die Entwicklung der Mathematik im 19. Jahrhundert
