= Gabriel Oltramare =

Swiss mathematician (1816-1906)

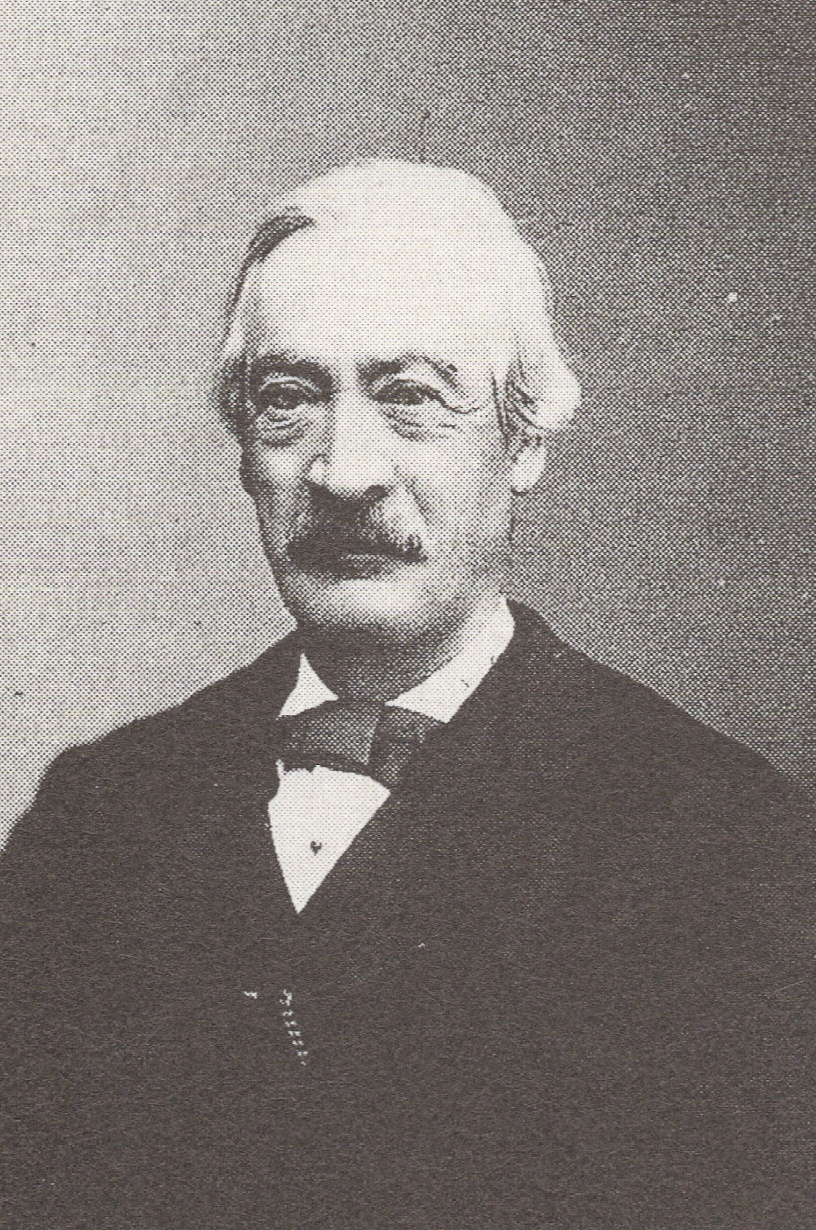
- Oltramare in 1885
- Born: 19 July 1816; Geneva, Canton of Geneva, Switzerland
- Died: 10 April 1906 (aged 89); Les Eaux-Vives, Canton of Geneva, Switzerland
- Education: Sorbonne
- Known for: Essai sur le Calcul de Généralisation
- Scientific career
- Fields: Number theory; Mathematical analysis
- Workplaces: University of Geneva

Gabriel Oltramare (19 July 1816 – 10 April 1906) was a Swiss mathematician, known for his book Essai sur le Calcul de Généralisation.

== Biography ==
Oltramare was born in Geneva on 19 July 1816, the son of cousins Anne Oltramare and Louis-David-Benjamin Oltramare, a watchcase maker. He belonged to a prominent family of Italian Protestant origin that settled in Geneva in the 16th century. Oltramare studied mathematics and natural sciences in Geneva from 1836 to 1839, then studied higher mathematics at the Sorbonne, graduating with a licence ès sciences mathématiques in 1840. He was a teacher in Aarau. From 1843 to 1844, Oltramare worked in Egypt as a tutor for Isma'il, son of Ibrahim Pasha of the Muhammad Ali dynasty. He was privat-docent of mechanics at Geneva's industrial school from 1845 to 1870, as well as professor of mathematics at the Collège de Genève from 1848 to 1850. In 1848, Oltramare was appointed professor ordinarius of higher mathematics at the Academy of Geneva.

At the beginning of his career he did research on number theory, on which he published several works; according to Henri Fehr, the most important of these is the 1855 Note sur les relations qui existent entre les formes linéaires et les formes quadratiques des numbers premiers. Later in his career Oltramare worked on mathematical analysis. In 1893 he published his treatise Essai sur le calcul de généralisation, with 2nd edition in 1899 and a Russian translation in 1895. He published several articles on astronomy and meteorology in scientific journals. He was one of the founders in 1853 of the Institut national genevois and presided from 1894 to 1902 over its section of natural sciences. He was a member in 1848 of the Conseil administratif de Genève and member from 1848 to 1854 of the Grand Council of Geneva, over which he presided several times. He was one of the organizers of the first International Congress of Mathematicians, which was held in Geneva in 1897.
