= Dingeldey =

Dingeldey is a surname. Notable people with the surname include:

- Eduard Dingeldey (1886–1942), German politician
- Friedrich Dingeldey (1859–1939), German mathematician
