= Emma Castelnuovo =

Italian mathematics teacher (1913–2014)

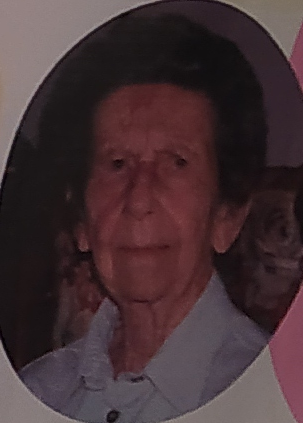
- Born: Emma Castelnuovo; 12 December 1913; Rome, Italy
- Died: 13 April 2014 (aged 100); Rome, Italy
- Scientific career
- Fields: Mathematics

Emma Castelnuovo (12 December 1913 – 13 April 2014) was an Italian mathematician and teacher of Jewish descent.

In 2013, the year of her 100th birthday, the International Commission on Mathematical Instruction created an award named after Castelnuovo to recognize outstanding contributions to mathematics education.

== Education and career ==
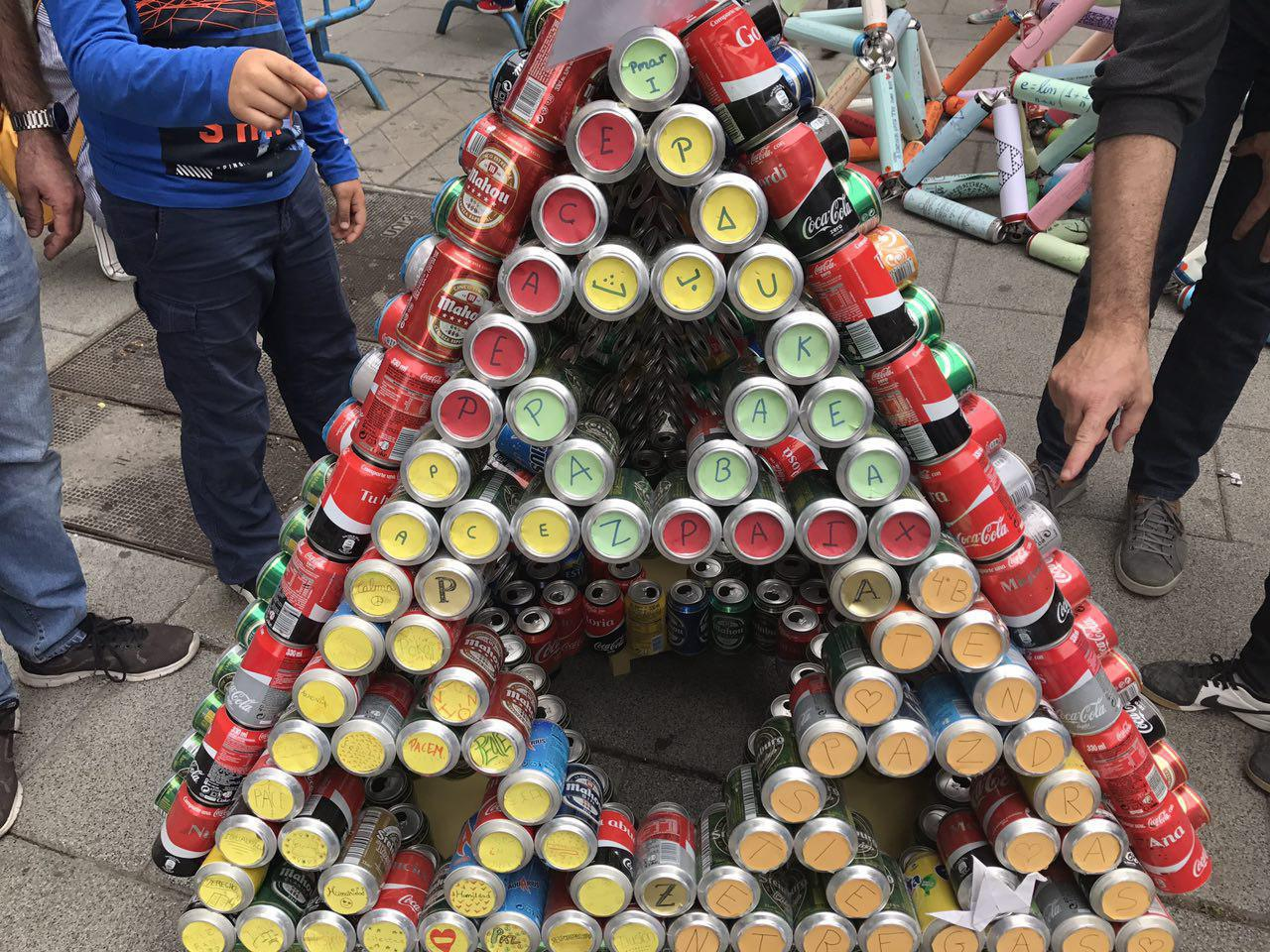
Emma Castelnuovo in collaboration with the Municipal Board of Chamberi carried out the experiment 'Mathematics in the Street' on Sunday, 21 May 2017, at Fuencarral street.

Emma Castelnuovo was born in Rome on 12 December 1913, the fifth child of Elbina and Guido Castelnuovo; her father and her mother's brother Federigo Enriques were both professors of mathematics.

Castelnuovo graduated from the University of Rome in 1936 with a thesis on algebraic geometry. After this she worked as a librarian at the same university. She won a permanent position there in 1938, but later that year, Italy passed new laws preventing Jews from holding state positions, preventing her from taking it.

From 1939 to 1943 she taught in Hebrew schools attended by Jewish students who had been kicked out of public schools as a result of the same racial legislation that denied Emma an official university position.

In 1943 the German occupation of Italy forced the entire Castelnuovo family to go underground, seeking shelter under a false name. They sought refuge with friends and then at hospitals, religious institutions, and small pensions, and continued all the time to travel frequently for their own safety.

With the end of World War II in 1945, she became a secondary school teacher and stayed there until her retirement in 1979. Even as she worked as a teacher, she conducted continuous research on the subject of mathematics education and published many papers.

In 1948 she published the first of many editions of the book Intuitive geometry, which demonstrated her personal approach to teaching mathematics. Her teaching texts have since been translated into several other languages and used in schools, especially in Spanish-speaking countries. In 1978 and 1980 she was sent by UNESCO to Niger to teach in a class that corresponded to the Italian eighth grade.

She served as president of the "International Commission for the Improvement of Mathematics Teaching."

She died in Rome on 13 April 2014 and was buried in the Verano cemetery with her father and mother.

== Selected works ==
Castelnuovo authored dozens of publications.

- Intuitive geometry for lower secondary schools, Rome, Carabba, 1949; Florence, The New Italy, 1952; 1959.
- The numbers. Practical arithmetic, Florence, La Nuova Italia, 1962.
- Didactics of Mathematics Florence, La Nuova Italia, 1963.
- Documents of a mathematical exhibition. "From children to men", Turin, Boringhieri, 1972.
- Mathematics in reality, with Mario Barra, Turin, Boringhieri, 1976.
- Mathematics, Florence, New Italy, 1979.
- Pots, shadows, ants. Traveling with mathematics, Scandicci, La Nuova Italia, 1993. ISBN 88-221-1165-6
- The math workshop. Reasoning with materials. The lessons of the greatest Italian researcher in mathematics education, Molfetta, La Meridiana, 2008. ISBN 978-88-6153-046-1

== External sources ==
- P. Odifreddi, The teacher who made people love geometry, in La Repubblica, 15 April 2014, p. 51
