= Integral of inverse functions =

Mathematical theorem, used in calculus

In mathematics, integrals of inverse functions can be computed by means of a formula that expresses the antiderivatives of the inverse $f^{-1}$ of a continuous and invertible function $f$, in terms of $f^{-1}$ and an antiderivative of $f$. This formula was published in 1905 by Charles-Ange Laisant.

== Statement of the theorem ==
Let $I_1$ and $I_2$ be two intervals of $\mathbb{R}$. Assume that $f: I_1\to I_2$ is a continuous and invertible function. It follows from the intermediate value theorem that $f$ is strictly monotone. Consequently, $f$ maps intervals to intervals, so is an open map and thus a homeomorphism. Since $f$ and the inverse function $f^{-1}:I_2\to I_1$ are continuous, they have antiderivatives by the fundamental theorem of calculus.

Laisant proved that if $F$ is an antiderivative of $f$, then the antiderivatives of $f^{-1}$ are:
$$\int f^{-1}(y) \, dy = y f^{-1}(y) - F \circ f^{-1}(y)+C,$$
where $C$ is an arbitrary real number. Note that it is not assumed that $f^{-1}$ is differentiable.

Illustration of the theorem

In his 1905 article, Laisant gave three proofs.

=== First proof ===
First, under the additional hypothesis that $f^{-1}$ is differentiable, one may differentiate the above formula, which completes the proof immediately.

=== Second proof ===
His second proof was geometric. If $f(a) = c$ and $f(b) = d$, the theorem can be written:
$$\int_c^d f^{-1} (y) \, dy + \int_a^b f(x) \, dx = bd - ac .$$
The figure on the right is a proof without words of this formula. Laisant does not discuss the hypotheses necessary to make this proof rigorous, but this can be proved if $f$ is just assumed to be strictly monotone (but not necessarily continuous, let alone differentiable). In this case, both $f$ and $f^{-1}$ are Riemann integrable and the identity follows from a bijection between lower/upper Darboux sums of $f$ and upper/lower Darboux sums of $f^{-1}$. The antiderivative version of the theorem then follows from the fundamental theorem of calculus in the case when $f$ is also assumed to be continuous.

=== Third proof ===
Laisant's third proof uses the additional hypothesis that $f$ is differentiable. Beginning with $f^{-1}(f(x)) = x$, one multiplies by $f'(x)$ and integrates both sides. The right-hand side is calculated using integration by parts to be $xf(x) - \int f(x) \, dx$, and the formula follows.

=== Details ===
One may also think as follows when $f$ is differentiable. As $f$ is continuous at any $x$, $F:= \int_0^x f(t) \, dt$ is differentiable at all $x$ by the fundamental theorem of calculus. Since $f$ is invertible, its derivative would vanish in at most countably many points. Sort these points by $... < t_{-1} < t_0 < t_1 < ...$. Since $g(y):= yf^{-1}(y) - F\circ f^{-1}(y) + C$ is a composition of differentiable functions on each interval $(t_i, t_{i + 1})$, chain rule could be applied $g'(y) = f^{-1}(y) + y/f'(y) - f\circ f^{-1}(y).1/f'(y) + 0 = f^{-1}(y)$ to see $\left.g\right|_{(t_i, t_{i + 1})}$ is an antiderivative for $\left.f\right|_{(t_i, t_{i + 1})}$. We claim $g$ is also differentiable on each of $t_i$ and does not go unbounded if $I_2$ is compact. In such a case $f^{-1}$ is continuous and bounded. By continuity and the fundamental theorem of calculus, $G(y) := C + \int_0^y f^{-1}(t) \, dt$ where $C$ is a constant, is a differentiable extension of $g$. But $g$ is continuous as it's the composition of continuous functions. So is $G$ by differentiability. Therefore, $G = g$. One can now use the fundamental theorem of calculus to compute $\int_{I_2} f^{-1}(t) \, dt$.

Nevertheless, it can be shown that this theorem holds even if $f$ or $f^{-1}$ is not differentiable: it suffices, for example, to use the Stieltjes integral in the previous argument. On the other hand, even though general monotonic functions are differentiable almost everywhere, the proof of the general formula does not follow, unless $f^{-1}$ is absolutely continuous.

It is also possible to check that for every $y$ in $I_2$, the derivative of the function $y \mapsto y f^{-1}(y) -F(f^{-1}(y))$ is equal to $f^{-1}(y)$. In other words:
$$\forall x \in I_1 \quad \lim_{h\to 0}\frac{(x+h)f(x+h)- x f(x) -\left(F(x+h)-F(x)\right)}{f(x+h) - f(x)} = x.$$
To this end, it suffices to apply the mean value theorem to $F$ between $x$ and $x+h$, taking into account that $f$ is monotonic.

== Examples ==
1. Assume that $f(x) = \exp(x)$, hence $f^{-1}(y) = \ln(y)$. The formula above gives immediately
  $$\int \ln(y) \, dy = y\ln(y)-\exp(\ln(y)) + C= y\ln(y)-y + C.$$
2. Similarly, with $f(x) = \cos(x)$ and $f^{-1}(y) = \arccos(y)$,
  $$\int \arccos(y) \, dy = y\arccos(y) - \sin(\arccos(y))+C.$$
3. With $f(x) = \tan(x)$ and $f^{-1}(y) = \arctan(y)$,
  $$\int \arctan(y) \, dy = y\arctan(y) + \ln \left|\cos(\arctan(y))\right| + C.$$

== History ==
Apparently, this theorem of integration was discovered for the first time in 1905 by Charles-Ange Laisant, who "could hardly believe that this theorem is new", and hoped its use would henceforth spread out among students and teachers. This result was published independently in 1912 by an Italian engineer, Alberto Caprilli, in an opuscule entitled "Nuove formole d'integrazione". It was rediscovered in 1955 by Parker, and by a number of mathematicians following him. Nevertheless, they all assume that f or f^{−1} is differentiable. The general version of the theorem, free from this additional assumption, was proposed by Michael Spivak in 1965, as an exercise in the Calculus, and a fairly complete proof following the same lines was published by Eric Key in 1994. This proof relies on the very definition of the Darboux integral, and consists in showing that the upper Darboux sums of the function f are in 1-1 correspondence with the lower Darboux sums of f^{−1}. In 2013, Michael Bensimhoun, estimating that the general theorem was still insufficiently known, gave two other proofs: The second proof, based on the Stieltjes integral and on its formulae of integration by parts and of homeomorphic change of variables, is the most suitable to establish more complex formulae.

== Generalization to holomorphic functions ==
The above theorem generalizes in the obvious way to holomorphic functions: Let $U$ and $V$ be two open and simply connected sets of $\mathbb{C}$, and assume that $f: U \to V$ is a biholomorphism. Then $f$ and $f^{-1}$ have antiderivatives, and if $F$ is an antiderivative of $f$, the general antiderivative of $f^{-1}$ is
$$G(z)= z f^{-1}(z)-F\circ f^{-1}(z)+C.$$

Because all holomorphic functions are differentiable, the proof is immediate by complex differentiation.

== See also ==
- Integration by parts
- Legendre transformation
- Young's inequality for products
