= Men of Mathematics =

Popular history book of mathematics by E.T. Bell

- First edition
- Author: E. T. Bell
- Language: English
- Subject: History of mathematics
- Published: 1937
- Publisher: Simon and Schuster
- Publication place: USA
- Pages: 608 (1986 edition)
- ISBN: 978-0671628185

Men of Mathematics: The Lives and Achievements of the Great Mathematicians from Zeno to Poincaré is a book on the history of mathematics published in 1937 by Scottish-born American mathematician and science fiction writer E. T. Bell (1883–1960). After a brief chapter on three ancient mathematicians, it covers the lives of about forty mathematicians who flourished in the seventeenth through nineteenth centuries. The book is illustrated by mathematical discussions, with emphasis on mainstream mathematics.

To keep the interest of readers, the book typically focuses on unusual or dramatic aspects of its subjects' lives. Men of Mathematics has inspired many young people, including John Forbes Nash Jr., Julia Robinson, and Freeman Dyson, to become mathematicians. It is not intended as a rigorous history, and includes many anecdotal accounts.

== Publication ==
In July 1935, Bell signed a contract with Simon and Schuster, for a book to be titled The Lives of Mathematicians. He delivered the manuscript at the beginning of November 1935 as promised, but was unhappy when the publishers made him cut about a third of it (125,000 words), and, in order to tie in with their book Men of Art (by Thomas Craven), gave it the title Men of Mathematics which he did not like. He was also unhappy with how long they took to print it: even before he had received his first printed copy in March 1937, he had written and got into print another book, The Handmaiden of the Sciences.

== Contents ==
- Eudoxus (408–355 BC)
- Archimedes (287?–212 BC)
- Descartes (1596–1650)
- Fermat (1601–1665)
- Pascal (1623–1662)
- Newton (1642–1727)
- Leibniz (1646–1716)
- The Bernoullis (17th and 18th century)
- Euler (1707–1783)
- Lagrange (1736–1813)
- Laplace (1749–1827)
- Monge (1746–1818)
- Fourier (1768–1830)
- Poncelet (1788–1867)
- Gauss (1777–1855)
- Cauchy (1789–1857)
- Lobachevsky (1793–1856)
- Abel (1802–1829)
- Hamilton (1805–1865)
- Galois (1811–1832)
- Sylvester (1814–1897)
- Cayley (1821–1895)
- Weierstrass (1815–1897)
- Sonja Kowalewski [sic] (1850–1891)
- Boole (1815–1864)
- Hermite (1822–1901)
- Kronecker (1823–1891)
- Riemann (1826–1866)
- Kummer (1810–1893)
- Dedekind (1831–1916)
- Poincaré (1854–1912)
- Cantor (1845–1918)

== Reception ==
Men of Mathematics remains widely read. It has received general praise and some criticism.

In the opinion of Ivor Grattan-Guinness the mathematics profession was poorly served by Bell's book:

...perhaps the most widely read modern book on the history of mathematics. As it is also one of the worst, it can be said to have done a considerable disservice to the profession.

Eric Bell was criticized in 1983 for incorrectly ascribing the origin of spacetime to Joseph Lagrange:

There is a general impression based on the widely read book of E.T. Bell that Lagrange, in his Méchanique Analytique, was the first to have connected time to space as a fourth coordinate. ...However, Lagrange did not express these thoughts quite as precisely as Bell seems to imply....Thus, it is far from certain after consulting the original text whether or not Lagrange came close to formulating, even in his own mind, the concept credited to him by Bell.

In reviewing the faculty that served with Harry Bateman at Caltech, Clifford Truesdell wrote:

...[Bell] was admired for his science fiction and his Men of Mathematics. I was shocked when, just a few years later, Walter Pitts told me the latter was nothing but a string of Hollywood scenarios; my own subsequent study of the sources has shown me that Pitts was right, and I now find the contents of that still popular book to be little more than rehashes enlivened by nasty gossip and banal or indecent fancy.

An impression of the book was given by Rebecca Goldstein in her novel 36 Arguments for the Existence of God. Describing a character Cass Seltzer, she wrote on page 105:

Right now he was reading E. T. Bell’s Men of Mathematics, which was the best yet, even though it had real mathematics in to slow him down. Some of these people sounded as if they had to be changelings, non-human visitors from some other sphere, with powers so prodigious they burst the boundaries of developmental psychology, lisping out profundities while other children were playing with their toes.

Theoretical physicist Freeman Dyson called his encounter with the book one of the decisive moments in his early career path, noting its ability to present famous mathematicians not as saints, but as flawed individuals of mixed qualities who nevertheless accomplished great mathematics.

== See also ==
- Felix Klein and Sophus Lie
