= Dianalytic manifold =

In mathematics, dianalytic manifolds are possibly non-orientable generalizations of complex analytic manifolds. A dianalytic structure on a manifold is given by an atlas of charts such that the transition maps are either complex analytic maps or complex conjugates of complex analytic maps. Every dianalytic manifold is given by the quotient of an analytic manifold (possibly non-connected) by a fixed-point-free involution changing the complex structure to its complex conjugate structure. Dianalytic manifolds were introduced by Klein (1882), and dianalytic manifolds of 1 complex dimension are sometimes called Klein surfaces.
