= L'Enseignement mathématique =

- Discipline: Mathematics
- Language: English and French

Publication details
- History: 1899 to present with suspension due to WW II
- Publisher: European Mathematical Society Publishing House (Switzerland)
- Frequency: Biannual
- Open access: Delayed

Standard abbreviations
- ISO 4: Enseign. Math.

Indexing
- CODEN: ENMAAR
- ISSN: 0013-8584 (print); 2309-4672 (web)
- LCCN: sf85004074
- OCLC no.: 02100735

Links
- Journal homepage; online access

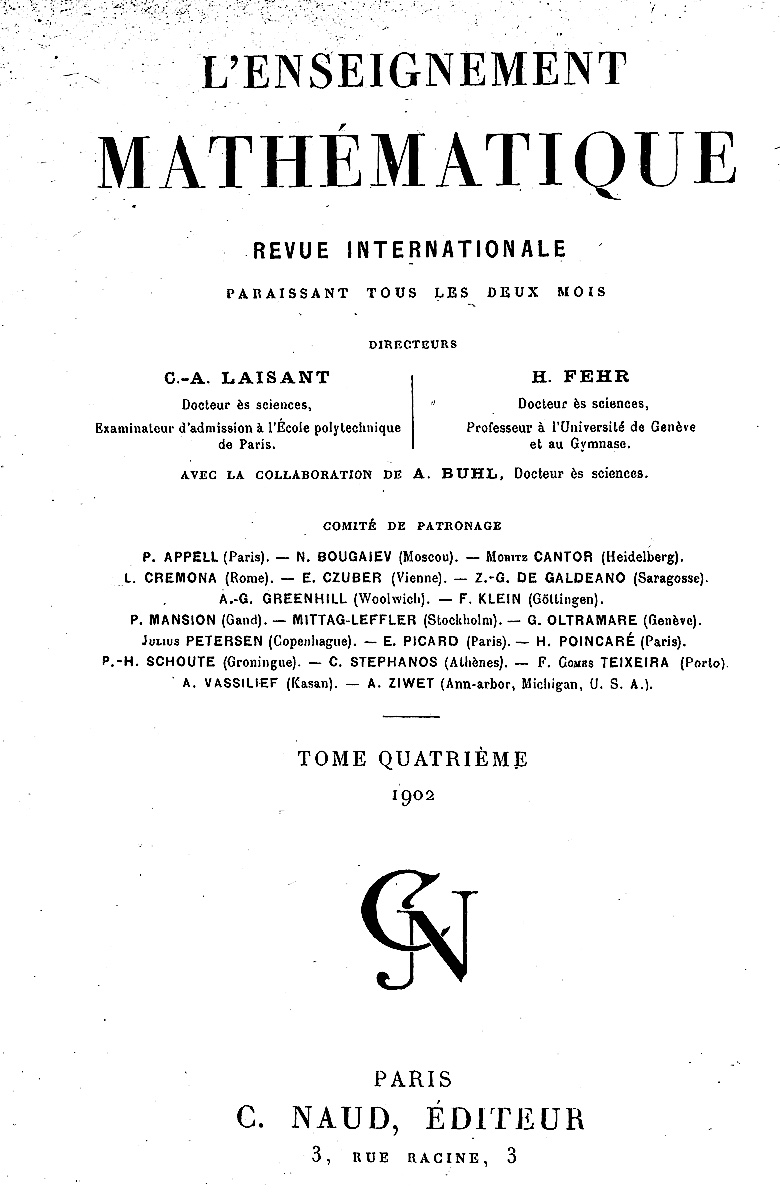

L’Enseignement mathématique is a journal for mathematics and mathematics education. It was founded in 1899 jointly by Henri Fehr from Geneva and by Charles-Ange Laisant from Paris as co-editors-in-chief. When Laisant died in 1920, Adolphe Buhl replaced him as co-editor-in-chief. Buhl died in 1949 and Fehr died in 1954 — since then the journal has been affiliated with the University of Geneva. It is the official organ of the International Commission on Mathematical Instruction (ICMI).

Despite the journal's name, it publishes few articles on mathematics education, but instead articles on mathematical reviews, mathematical research, and contributions to the history of mathematics.

Since volume 60 (2015) the articles have been published by the European Mathematical Society.

Articles published more than five years ago are freely available online. The articles appear in English or French. Before World War II, the articles were in French.

Volume 38 of the journal covers the years 1939–1942. In 1942 publication was suspended and resumed with volume 39 covering the years 1942–1950.
