= Vorlesungen über die Entwicklung der Mathematik im 19. Jahrhundert =

1920s books on mathematical history by Felix Klein

Cover of Development of Mathematics in The 19th Century, by Felix Klein, translated from the German into English by M. Ackerman

Vorlesungen über die Entwicklung der Mathematik im 19. Jahrhundert (German for 'Lectures on the Development of Mathematics in the 19th Century') is a book by Felix Klein that was published posthumously in two volumes (volumes 24 and 25 of Grundlehren der mathematischen Wissenschaften) in 1926 and 1927.

Felix Klein had lectured on the development of mathematics in the 19th century and then on relativity during World War I. The books were created from the notes of these lectures and edited by Richard Courant and Otto Neugebauer for the first volume and Courant and Stefan Cohn-Vossen for the second. Some content that Klein had originally envisioned as part of the text is missing.

The book has been enthusiastically received and widely praised. The first volume has been translated into Russian in 1937 and into English in 1979; in 1989, a second Russian translation appeared, followed in 2003 by a translation of the second volume. Both volumes have also been translated into Chinese.

== Background and publication ==
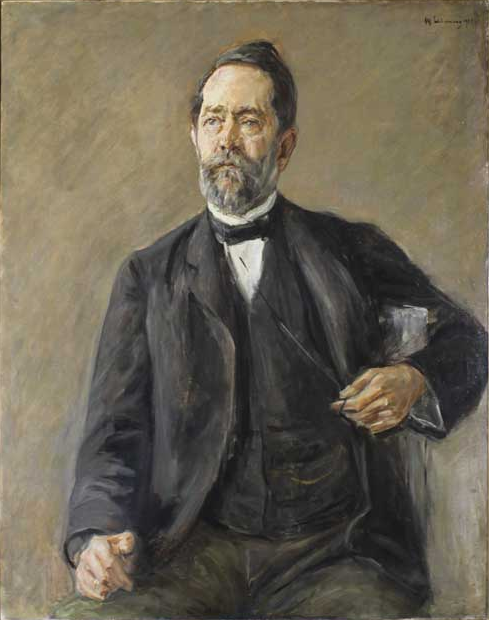
Portrait of Felix Klein by Max Liebermann, 1912

Felix Klein (1849–1925) was a German mathematician best known for his Erlangen program, which emphasised the use of groups in geometry. From 1886 to 1913 he was professor at the University of Göttingen, which became one of the leading centres of mathematical research under his leadership.

Klein was interested in the history of mathematics and bought relevant books for the Göttingen library. One of his students, Conrad Müller, studied for a PhD in history of mathematics under Klein and was later awarded the first habilitation degree in Göttingen in this topic area. Klein was responsible for the mathematical content in an encyclopaedic project called Die Kultur der Gegenwart ('The Culture of the Present') published by B. G. Teubner Verlag in Leipzig, a publishing house he had longstanding ties with. The history of mathematics was supposed to be covered in three volumes; H. G. Zeuthen was responsible for the period up to the middle ages and Paul Stäckel for the time from 1500 to 1800. For covering 19th century applied mathematics, Klein tried to convince Heinrich Weber and Carl Runge, but he eventually accepted he had to do it himself.

Klein planned to lecture on the development of mathematics in the 19th century in the winter semester of 1910/11 and again in the winter semester of 1912/13, but both times was unable to do so. The classes were then taught privately during World War I. The winter 1914/15 courses were not announced in the Vorlesungsverzeichnis (list of lectures), while the summer 1915 and winter 1915/16 courses were announced as "privatissime and free of charge". The first semester of lectures was attended by 24 people, including 13 male students, 9 faculty and 2 women. The women were Iris Runge and Klein's daughter Elisabeth Staiger. The first two semesters of lecture notes were edited and typed by the recently widowed Staiger, while the third course was worked on by Käthe Heinemann and Helene Stähelin. Stähelin's part, completed in Basel in 1918, included figures drawn by Erwin Voellmy. For a few years, the lecture notes were only available as these typescripts. After Klein's death, Richard Courant and Otto Neugebauer edited the notes and published the first volume in 1926 in the Springer Verlag's "yellow series", Grundlehren der mathematischen Wissenschaften. In their preface, they explained that they had changed as little as possible in the original text and admitted it was closer to a draft than to a thorough and balanced presentation of the history. While they thanked several other mathematicians for their help, they did not mention the three women who had prepared the typescripts from the original lectures anywhere in the book.

Possibly because the Kultur der Gegenwart project was running into financial difficulties caused by the war, or because of his personal interests, Klein's lectures from 1916 onwards were concerned with relativity, and he postponed working on content regarding the works of Poincaré and Sophus Lie. Starting in 1916, Klein taught his lectures in his own house to avoid having to walk to the university. The notes were taken by Klein's assistant Walter Baade. Klein's lectures on "selected aspects of newer mathematics" were concerned with Einstein, the special theory of relativity on an invariant basis, and the foundations of general relativity. In 1916, his audience of 14 included the professors Runge and Carathéodory and the Swiss student Paul Finsler. Hilbert's assistant Emmy Noether and Käthe Heinemann were among the five women in attendance, and there were two blind students, Willi Windau and Friedrich Mittelsten Scheid. In winter 1916/17, there were seven attendees: Baade, Richard Bär, Josef Engel, Vsevolod Frederiks, Heinemann, Rudolf Jakob Humm and Windau. Klein sent a version of his summer 1917 lectures on general relativity to Albert Einstein, who dismissed the approach as overemphasising the formal over the heuristic point of view. In 1927, the lectures were published as the second volume of Vorlesungen über die Entwicklung der Mathematik im 19. Jahrhundert, with the additional subtitle Die Grundbegriffe der Invariantentheorie und ihr Eindringen in die mathematische Physik ('The Fundamental Concepts of Invariant Theory and Their Infiltration into Mathematical Physics'). The editors were Courant and especially Stefan Cohn-Vossen, who admitted the fragmentary character of the book in their introduction.

== Content ==
The first volume is organised in eight chapters; the first chapter, simply titled "Gauß", is concerned with the life and work of Carl Friedrich Gauss and split into a section on applied and one on pure mathematics. The second chapter, "France and the École Polytechnique in the First Decades of the Nineteenth Century", contains sections on mechanics and mathematical physics (including the work of Poisson, Fourier and Cauchy), geometry (Monge and his followers), analysis and algebra (focusing on Cauchy and Galois). The third chapter "The Founding of Crelle's Journal and the Rise of Pure Mathematics in Germany" is concerned with mathematicians connected to Crelle's Journal (the analysts Dirichlet, Abel and Jacobi and the geometers Moebius, Plücker and Steiner), is followed by a chapter on "The Development of Algebraic Geometry after Moebius, Plücker and Steiner", with sections on projective geometry, invariant theory and n-dimensional spaces and general complex numbers, including content on Graßmann and Hamilton. In the fifth chapter, "Mechanics and Mathematical Physics in Germany and England until about 1880", Klein discusses Hamilton's and Jacobi's works on mechanics and works of English mathematicians including Green, Stokes and Maxwell. Chapter 6, "The General Theory of Functions of Complex Variables according to Riemann and Weierstraß" contrasts Riemann's approach to complex analysis with that of Weierstraß, and is followed by Chapter 7, "Deeper Insight into the Nature of Algebraic Varieties and Structures", which discusses algebraic geometry (including contributions by Clebsch and Noether) and algebraic number theory (Kummer, Dedekind and Hilbert, among others). In the final chapter, "Group Theory and Function Theory; Automorphic Functions", Klein discusses first group theory in connection with the works of Lagrange, Galois and C. Jordan. In the section on automorphic forms, he treats hypergeometric functions, conformal mappings, the icosahedron and elliptic functions, including a few pages on Poincaré. Originally, Klein had also planned to include full chapters on Poincaré and Sophus Lie in the book, but these are missing. Additionally, he planned to discuss set theory, the 1900 International Congress of Mathematicians and Hilbert's problems.

The second volume is organised in three chapters. The first chapter, "Elementary Content regarding the Fundamentals of Linear Invariant Theory", is split into part A about general linear invariant theory and a "freer" part B about linear invariant theory including comments on the Erlangen Program and the development of vector and tensor analysis. The second chapter, "The Special Theory of Relativity in Mechanics and Mathematical Physics", has three parts: Part A is concerned with classical celestial mechanics, part B with Maxwell's electrodynamics and the Lorentz group, while part C treats the adaptation of mechanics to the relativity theory of the Lorentz group. The third chapter, "Transformation Groups on the Basis of a Quadratic Differential Form", has five parts. Part A treats Lagrangian mechanics, part B the intrinsic differential geometry of surfaces following Gauß. The remaining parts are concerned with Riemannian geometry: part C contains the formal background of Riemannian manifolds, part D normal coordinates and geometric interpretations, and part E reports on the further development after the time of Riemann, including the work of Beltrami, Lipschitz and Christoffel. A planned fourth chapter on the general theory of relativity and Hamiltonian mechanics with a focus on contact transformations and Lie groups was not finished; the editors stated that none of the existing drafts could have been turned into a printable form without adding an additional author's thoughts to Klein's approach. In contrast to the first volume, the second volume has a more systematic and factual focus and has fewer biographical and historical remarks.

== Reception and legacy ==
The books were received enthusiastically and especially the first volume has been widely celebrated. G. A. Miller, reviewing the first volume in Science, sees Klein as the most eminent mathematician to write a general history and finds the "extremely difficult task ... well begun", and praises Klein's personal acquaintance with most leading mathematicians. Josef Lense's review praises the editors and finds Klein the most suited person to the task. David Eugene Smith, writing for the Bulletin of the American Mathematical Society, calls Klein a "master" and emphasises the lack of national prejudice in the work. F. P. White's admiring review in The Mathematical Gazette calls the book "fascinating" and mentions several "curious and entertaining" episodes. The historian of mathematics Heinrich Wieleitner reviewed both volumes for Isis. His review of the first volume warmly welcomes its publication and the information coming from Klein's personal involvement, but criticises some of Klein's methods as not up to the standards of scientific historiography. The overall verdict is that the book is eine sehr wertvolle Vorarbeit zu einer wirklichen Geschichte der Mathematik des 19. Jahrh. ('a very valuable preliminary work for a true history of 19th century mathematics'). The second volume is described as incomplete but admirable. Although the reviewer notes a near-total lack of the personal touch of the first volume, he praises a few beautiful passages.

The books had a great influence on Dirk Jan Struik, who had helped the editors in preparing the original manuscripts. In his later book A Concise History of Mathematics, Struik calls them "the best history of nineteenth century mathematics". The Soviet mathematician Vladimir Arnold deeply valued the books, and remarked in an interview that much of what he had learned about mathematics ("One-half of the mathematics I know", in his own words) came through their study. He often recommended them to his students.

Reviewing the English edition of the book, the French mathematician Jean Dieudonné praises the idea of a new edition and notes that Klein's book has long been the only one on its topic, and still among the best. Nevertheless, he gives a long list of omissions and laments the lack of an index. In another French review of the German reprint of both volumes, Pierre Dugac calls the book "irreplaceable" and praises Klein's expressions of the "mood" of 19th century mathematics, but criticises the lack of a modern introduction putting the book in context of newer historical works. Welcoming the reprint, the East German historian of mathematics Hans Wußing calls the book a part of the fundamental mathematical-historical literature, while noting that some of Klein's opinions are subjective and have been superseded.

In his book about Klein and Sophus Lie, the Soviet mathematician Isaak Yaglom defends Klein against accusations of chauvinism brought forward by Jacques Hadamard in 1943. While admitting that Klein ignored the contributions of Russian and Italian mathematicians and some fields like probability theory, Yaglom writes, "the book's import lies in the concept of joint work by scientists of all races and nationalities, contributing perhaps in different ways, but with equal merit, to the construction of the mathematical edifice." The mathematician and historian Detlef Laugwitz quotes Klein's Vorlesungen in his book about Bernhard Riemann, calling Klein "important as a witness of the effect of Riemann's ideas in the last decades of the 19th century". The historian of mathematics David E. Rowe describes them as "a highly personalized account of this period", and notes that the original lecture notes "were sometimes even more opinionated, expressing his misgivings about recent modernist trends toward abstraction and axiomatics".

== Translations ==
The book was translated into Russian twice, both times as Лекции о развитии математики в XIX столетии. The 1937 edition was translated by B. Livshits, A. Lopshits, Y. Rabinovich and L. Tumerman and had a preface by the Soviet historian of mathematics Mark Vygodskii. It contained some errors. For example, it mistranslated Jacobi dying from Blattern (smallpox) as dying in a place called Blattern. The second version appeared in 1989, translated by N. M. Nagorny and edited by M. M. Postnikov. In the preface, which builds on Vygodskii's, they noted that their main focus was to be as faithful as possible to Klein's thought and the spirit of his work. In 2003, also the second volume appeared, translated by V. A. Antonov and edited by B. P. Kondratyev.

The book was translated into English by M. Ackerman as Development of Mathematics in The 19th Century (1979), edited by Robert Hermann, who provided a lengthy appendix on "Kleinian Mathematics from an Advanced Standpoint". It was translated into Chinese as 数学在19世纪的发展 as part of the 数学翻译丛书 (Mathematical Translations series) edited by Shing-Tung Yau for Higher Education Press. The first volume appeared in 2010, translated by Qi Minyou; the second in 2011, translated by Li Peilian (李培廉). The first volume includes a translation into Chinese of Hermann's preface to the English translation.

=== List of translations ===
- Klein, Felix (1937). Lekcii o razvitii matematiki v XIX stoletii (in Russian). Moscow; Leningrad: Ob'edinennoye nauchno-tekhnicheskoye izdatelstvo NKTP SSSR.
- Klein, Felix (1979a). Development of mathematics in the 19th century. Translated by Ackerman, M. Brookline, Mass: Math Sci Press. ISBN 0-915692-28-7.
- Klein, Felix (1989). Lekcii o razvitii matematiki v XIX stoletii. 1. Moscow: Nauka. ISBN 978-5-02-013920-6.
- Klein, Felix (2003). Lekcii o razvitii matematiki v XIX stoletii. 2. Moscow; Izhevsk: Institut Komp'yuternykh Issledovaniy. ISBN 5-93972-208-3.
- Klein, Felix (2010). 数学在19世纪的发展 (第一卷) (in Chinese). 高等教育出版社. ISBN 978-7-04-028886-5.
- Klein, Felix (2011). 数学在19世纪的发展 (第二卷) (in Chinese). 高等教育出版社. ISBN 978-7-04-032284-2.
