= W-curve =

In geometry, a W-curve is a curve in projective n-space that is invariant under a 1-parameter group of projective transformations. W-curves were first investigated by Felix Klein and Sophus Lie in 1871, who also named them. W-curves in the real projective plane can be constructed with straightedge alone. Many well-known curves are W-curves, among them conics, logarithmic spirals, powers (like y = x^{3}), logarithms and the helix, but not e.g. the sine. W-curves occur widely in the realm of plants.

A typical plane W-curve with source O and sink Y

== Name ==
The 'W' stands for the German 'Wurf' – a throw – which in this context refers to a series of four points on a line. A 1-dimensional W-curve (read: the motion of a point on a projective line) is determined by such a series.

The German "W-Kurve" sounds almost exactly like "Weg-Kurve" and the last can be translated by "path curve". That is why in the English literature one often finds "path curve" or "pathcurve".

== See also ==
- Homography
- Superformula – also used to model botanical shapes
