= Adolf Weiler =

Swiss mathematician (1851–1916)

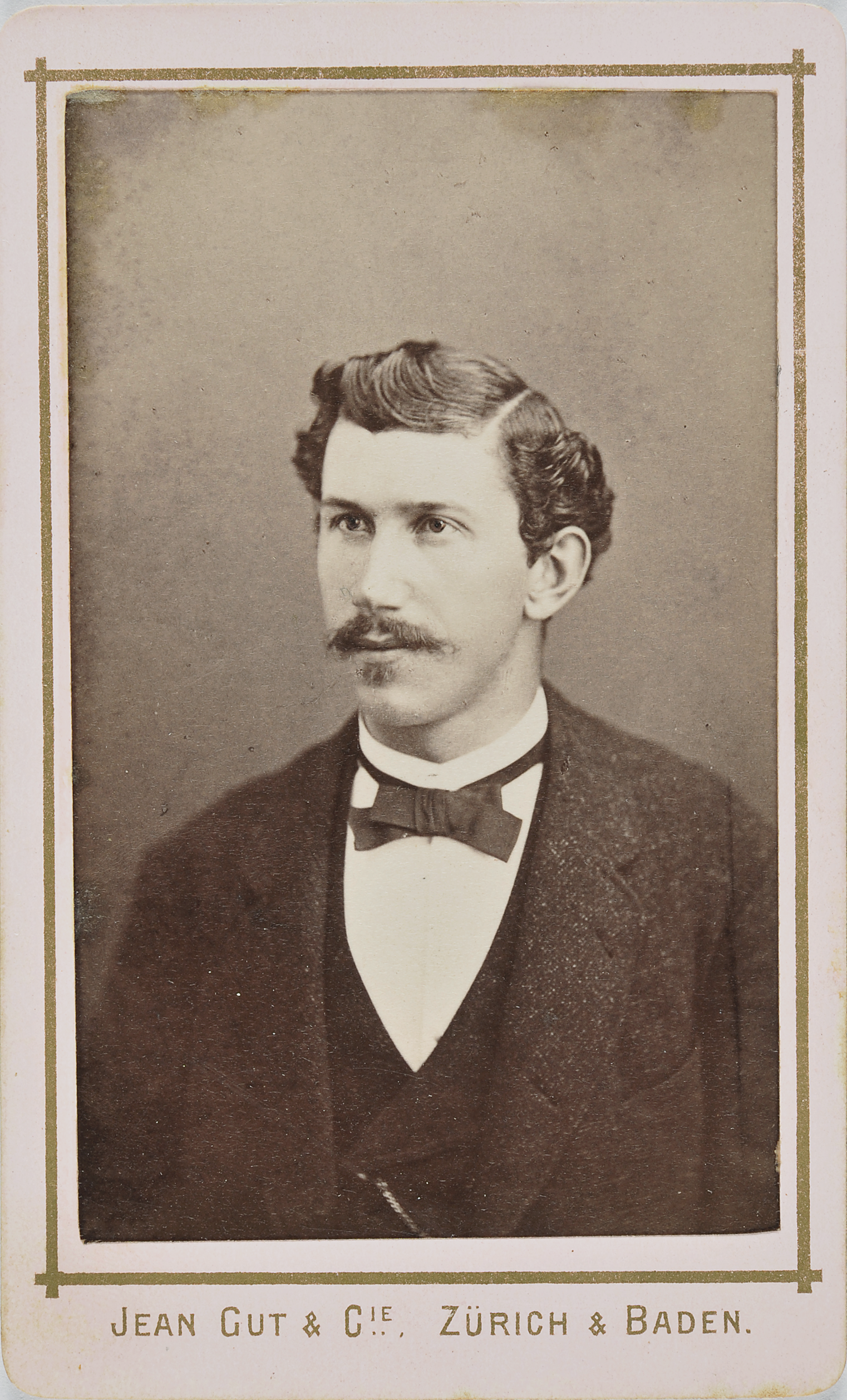
- Born: 27 December 1851; Winterthur, Switzerland
- Died: 1 May 1916 (aged 64)
- Education: University of Erlangen
- Scientific career
- Fields: Mathematics
- Workplaces: ETH Zurich; University of Zurich
- Thesis: Ueber die verschiedenen Gattungen der Complexe zweiten Grades (1874)
- Doctoral advisor: Felix Klein

Adolf Weiler (1851–1916) was a Swiss mathematician.

== Life and work ==
After his studies in the Department of Mathematics Teachers of the Polytechnicum of Zurich, he went to study at university of Göttingen and university of Erlangen under Alfred Clebsch and Felix Klein. He was awarded doctor in 1874 with a dissertation on quadratic line complexes. Some years before, in 1872, he constructed a model of the Clebsch's diagonal surface.

Returned to Switzerland, he was mathematics professor at Ryffel Institute and he obtained the venia legendi both at Polytechnicum as the University of Zurich. His main research was in algebraic geometry.

== Bibliography ==
- Hernández, Sergio; Perea, Carmen; Polo Blanco, Irene; Ramírez, Cayetano (Tano) (2006). "Models of Cubic Surfaces in Polyester". In Reza Sarhangi; John Sharp (eds.). Bridges London 2006. Tarquin Publications. pp. 309–314. ISBN 978-0-9665201-7-0.
- Labs, Oliver (2017). "Straight Lines on Models of Curved Surfaces". The Mathematical Intelligencer. 39 (2): 15–26. doi:10.1007/s00283-017-9709-y. ISSN 0343-6993. S2CID 125861812.
- Rowe, David E. (2016). "Segre, Klein, and the Theory of Quadratic Line Complexes". In Gianfranco Casnati; Alberto Conte; Letterio Gatto; Livia Giacardi; Marina Marchisio; Alessandro Verra (eds.). From Classical to Modern Algebraic Geometry. Trends in the History of Science. Birkhäuser. pp. 243–263. doi:10.1007/978-3-319-32994-9_3. ISBN 978-3-319-32992-5.
