= Klein surface =

Dianalytic manifold of complex dimension 1

In mathematics, a Klein surface is a dianalytic manifold of complex dimension 1. Klein surfaces may have a boundary and need not be orientable. Klein surfaces generalize Riemann surfaces. While the latter are used to study algebraic curves over the complex numbers analytically, the former are used to study algebraic curves over the real numbers analytically. Klein surfaces were introduced by Felix Klein in 1882.

A Klein surface is a surface (i.e., a differentiable manifold of real dimension 2) on which the notion of angle between two tangent vectors at a given point is well-defined, and so is the angle between two intersecting curves on the surface. These angles are in the range [0,π]; since the surface carries no notion of orientation, it is not possible to distinguish between the angles α and −α. (By contrast, on Riemann surfaces are oriented and angles in the range of (-π,π] can be meaningfully defined.) The length of curves, the area of submanifolds and the notion of geodesic are not defined on Klein surfaces.

Two Klein surfaces X and Y are considered equivalent if there are conformal (i.e. angle-preserving but not necessarily orientation-preserving) differentiable maps f:X→Y and g:Y→X that map boundary to boundary and satisfy fg = id_{Y} and gf = id_{X}.

== Examples ==
Every Riemann surface (analytic manifold of complex dimension 1, without boundary) is a Klein surface. Examples include open subsets of the complex plane (non-compact), the Riemann sphere (compact), and tori (compact). Note that there are many different inequivalent Riemann surfaces with the same underlying torus as manifold.

A closed disk in the complex plane is a Klein surface (compact, with boundary). All closed disks are equivalent as Klein surfaces. A closed annulus in the complex plane is a Klein surface (compact, with boundary). Not all annuli are equivalent as Klein surfaces: there is a one-parameter family of inequivalent Klein surfaces arising in this way from annuli. By removing a number of open disks from the Riemann sphere, we obtain another class of Klein surfaces (compact, with boundary). The real projective plane can be turned into a Klein surface (compact, without boundary), in essentially only one way. The Klein bottle can be turned into a Klein surface (compact, without boundary); there is a one-parameter family of inequivalent Klein surfaces structures defined on the Klein bottle. Similarly, there is a one-parameter family of inequivalent Klein surface structures (compact, with boundary) defined on the Möbius strip.

Every compact topological 2-manifold (possibly with boundary) can be turned into a Klein surface, often in many different inequivalent ways.

== Properties ==
The boundary of a compact Klein surface consists of finitely many connected components, each of which being homeomorphic to a circle. These components are called the ovals of the Klein surface.

Suppose Σ is a (not necessarily connected) Riemann surface and τ:Σ→Σ is an anti-holomorphic (orientation-reversing) involution. Then the quotient Σ/τ carries a natural Klein surface structure, and every Klein surface can be obtained in this manner in essentially only one way. The fixed points of τ correspond to the boundary points of Σ/τ. The surface Σ is called an "analytic double" of Σ/τ.

The Klein surfaces form a category; a morphism from the Klein surface X to the Klein surface Y is a differentiable map f:X→Y which on each coordinate patch is either holomorphic or the complex conjugate of a holomorphic map and furthermore maps the boundary of X to the boundary of Y.

There is a one-to-one correspondence between smooth projective algebraic curves over the reals (up to isomorphism) and compact connected Klein surfaces (up to equivalence). The real points of the curve correspond to the boundary points of the Klein surface. Indeed, there is an equivalence of categories between the category of smooth projective algebraic curves over R (with regular maps as morphisms) and the category of compact connected Klein surfaces. This is akin to the correspondence between smooth projective algebraic curves over the complex numbers and compact connected Riemann surfaces. (Note that the algebraic curves considered here are abstract curves: integral, separated one-dimensional schemes of finite type over R. Such a curve need not have any R-rational points (like the curve X^{2}+Y^{2}+1=0 over R), in which case its Klein surface will have empty boundary.)

There is also a one-to-one correspondence between compact connected Klein surfaces (up to equivalence) and algebraic function fields in one variable over R (up to R-isomorphism). This correspondence is akin to the one between compact connected Riemann surfaces and algebraic function fields over the complex numbers. If X is a Klein surface, a function f:X→Cu{∞} is called meromorphic if, on each coordinate patch, f or its complex conjugate is meromorphic in the ordinary sense, and if f takes only real values (or ∞) on the boundary of X. Given a connected Klein surface X, the set of meromorphic functions defined on X form a field M(X), an algebraic function field in one variable over R. M is a contravariant functor and yields a duality (contravariant equivalence) between the category of compact connected Klein surfaces (with non-constant morphisms) and the category of function fields in one variable over the reals.

One can classify the compact connected Klein surfaces X up to homeomorphism (not up to equivalence!) by specifying three numbers (g, k, a): the genus g of the analytic double Σ, the number k of connected components of the boundary of X, and the number a, defined by a=0 if X is orientable and a=1 otherwise. We always have k ≤ g+1. The Euler characteristic of X equals 1-g.
