= International Commission on Mathematical Instruction =

International Mathematics Union subgroup (founded 1908)

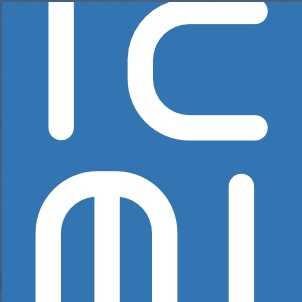
- ICMI Logo in 2024

The International Commission on Mathematical Instruction (ICMI) is a commission of the International Mathematical Union and is an internationally acting organization focusing on mathematics education. ICMI was founded in 1908 at the International Congress of Mathematicians (ICM) in Rome and aims to improve teaching standards around the world, through programs, workshops and initiatives and publications. It aims to work a great deal with developing countries, to increase teaching standards and education which can improve life quality and aid the country.

== History ==
ICMI was founded at the ICM, and mathematician Felix Klein was elected first president of the organisation. Henri Fehr and Charles Laisant created the international research journal L'Enseignement Mathématique in 1899, and from early on this journal became the official organ of ICMI. A bulletin is published twice a year by ICMI, and from December 1995 this bulletin has been available at the organisation's official website, in their 'digital library'.

In the years between World War I and World War II there was little activity in the organization, but in 1952 ICMI was reconstituted. At this time the organization was reorganized, and it became an official commission of the International Mathematical Union (IMU). As a scientific organization, IMU is a member of the International Council for Science (ICSU). Although ICMI follows the general principles of IMU and ICSU, the organization has a large degree of autonomy.

== Structure ==
All countries that are members of IMU are automatically members of ICMI; membership is also possible for non-IMU members. Currently, there are 90 member states of ICMI. Each member state has the right to appoint a national representative.

As a commission, ICMI has two main bodies:

- the Executive Committee (EC)
- the national representatives from the member countries

Together, these two constitute the General Assembly (GA) of ICMI. The GA is summoned every four years in connection with the International Congress on Mathematical Education (ICME). The executive committee is appointed by the general assembly of IMU for four-year terms.

== Affiliate Organisations ==
These include multi-national organisations, which are independent from ICMI and have interests in the field of mathematics.

There are currently four multinational Mathematical Education Societies:

- CIAEM: Inter-American Committee on Mathematics Education (2009)
- CIEAEM: International Commission for the Study and Improvement of Mathematics Teaching (2010)
- ERME: European Society for Research in Mathematics Education (2010)
- MERGA: Mathematics Education Research Group of Australasia (2011)

And six international Study Groups which have obtained affiliation with ICMI:

- HPM: The International Study Group on the Relations between the History and Pedagogy of Mathematics (1976)
- ICTMA: The International Study Group for Mathematical Modelling and Applications (2003)
- IOWME: The International Organization of Women and Mathematics Education (1987)
- IGMCG: The International Group for Mathematical Creativity and Giftedness (2011)
- PME: The International Group for the Psychology of Mathematics Education (1976)
- WFNMC: The World Federation of National Mathematics Competitions (1994)

== International Congress on Mathematical Education ==
The International Congress on Mathematical Education (ICME) is a quadrennial international conference organised under the auspices of ICMI to encourage and improve discourse on the development of mathematical education across the world. The first ever ICME was held in 1969 under the initiative of then ICMI President Hans Freudenthal. To date, there have been fifteen ICMEs in fourteen countries spread over all populated continents except Africa.

ICMEs Till Date
| Name of Conference & Proceedings | Year | City | Notes |
|---|---|---|---|
| ICME-1 | 1969 | Lyon, France | The first of only two ICMEs not to have been held in a leap year, second being ICME14. |
| ICME-2 | 1972 | Exeter, UK | |
| ICME-3 | 1976 | Karlsruhe, Germany | |
| ICME-44 | 1980 | Berkeley, USA | |
| ICME-5 | 1984 | Adelaide, Australia | |
| ICME-6 | 1988 | Budapest, Hungary | |
| ICME-7 | 1992 | Quebec, Canada | |
| ICME-8 | 1996 | Seville, Spain | |
| ICME-9 | 2000 | Tokyo, Japan | |
| ICME-10 | 2004 | Copenhagen, Denmark | |
| ICME-11 | 2008 | Monterrey, Mexico | No official proceedings published, some details available on ICMI website |
| ICME-12 | 2012 | Seoul, South Korea | |
| ICME-13 | 2016 | Hamburg, Germany | |
| ICME-14; Proceedings Vol. 1 Proceedings Vol. 2 | 2021 | Shanghai, China | Delayed from 2020, hence 2nd Congress not on leap year |
| ICME-15; Proceedings not yet available | 2024 | Sydney Australia | Sparked controversy over allegations of discrimination against women of color & institutional casteism after the extra-procedural expulsion of Dr. Jayasree Subramanian. |
| ICME-16 | 2028 | Prague, Czech Republic | Scheduled for July 2028. |

== ICMI Studies ==
Each ICMI Study addresses an issue or topic of particular significance in contemporary mathematics education and is conducted by an international team of leading scholars and practitioners in that domain. The best contributing professionals from around the world are then invited to a carefully planned and structured international conference/workshop. Beyond the productive interaction and collaborations occasioned by this event, the main product is a Study volume, which are published in the New ICMI Study Series (NISS) by Springer Science+Business Media.

== Awards ==
From 2000 onwards ICMI has been presenting the Felix Klein Award and the Hans Freudenthal Award. These prizes recognise outstanding achievement in mathematics education research. In 2013 the ICMI Emma Castelnuovo Award for Excellence in the Practice of Mathematics Education was created.

- The Felix Klein Award, named after the first president of the ICMI (1908-1920), honours a lifetime achievement: Guy Brousseau (2003), Ubiratan D'Ambrosio (2005), Jeremy Kilpatrick (2007), Gilah Leder (2009), Michèle Artigue (2013).
- The Hans Freudenthal Award, named after the eighth president of ICMI (1967-1970), recognises a major cumulative programme of research: Celia Hoyles (2003), Paul Cobb (2005), Anna Sfard (2007), Yves Chevallard (2009), Luis Radford (2011), Frederick Leung (2013).
- The ICMI Emma Castelnuovo Award The award recognizes outstanding achievements in the practice of mathematics education. The award is named after Emma Castelnuovo, an Italian mathematics educator born in 1913 to celebrate her 100th birthday and honour her pioneering work. Awardees: Hugh Burkhardt and Malcolm Swan (2016).

=== ICMI Emma Castelnuovo Award ===
In 2013 the ICMI Emma Castelnuovo Award for Excellence in the Practice of Mathematics Education was created. The award recognizes outstanding achievements in the practice of mathematics education. The award is named after Emma Castelnuovo, an Italian mathematics educator born in 1913 to celebrate her 100th birthday and honour her pioneering work.

The award honours persons, groups, projects, institutions or organizations engaged in the development and implementation of exceptional and influential work in the practice of mathematics education, including: classroom teaching, curriculum development, instructional design (of materials or pedagogical models), teacher preparation programs and/or field projects with a shown influence on schools, districts, regions or countries.

The award consists of a medal and a certificate accompanied by a citation and will be awarded only once every four years, delivered at the International Congress on Mathematical Education (ICME).

At each ICME, the medals and certificates of the awards are presented at the Opening Ceremony. Furthermore, the awardees are invited to present special lectures at the Congress.

== CANP ==
The Capacity & Networking Project is an international initiative to support mathematics education in the developing world and is a joint initiative of the international bodies of mathematicians (IMU) and mathematics educators (ICMI) in conjunction with UNESCO and International Congress of Industrial and Applied Mathematics, ICIAM. The project is a response to the report: Current Challenges in Basic Mathematics Education (UNESCO, 2011). CANP aims to enhance mathematics education at all levels in developing countries so that their people are capable of meeting the challenges these countries face. The first program was held in Bamako in Mali in September, 2011. The follow-up meeting took place in Senegal in 2012. The second program was held in Costa Rica in 2012 and created a successful regional network.

== Klein Project ==
The Klein Project was launched in 2008 and aims to support mathematics teachers to connect the mathematics they teach, to the field of mathematics, while taking into account the evolution of this field over the last century. The Klein Project is inspired by Felix Klein's book, Elementary Mathematics from an Advanced Standpoint, published in 1908 and 1909. The project will have two main outputs: a book published in several languages and a blog which includes many materials for mathematics teachers to be used in the classroom.
