= Friedrich Dingeldey =

German mathematician (1859–1939)

Friedrich Dingeldey (16 December 1859, Darmstadt – 24 September 1939, Darmstadt) was a German mathematician.

== Education and career ==
After secondary education at Ludwig Georgs Gymnasium in Darmstadt, Dingeldey studied at the universities of Giessen, Leipzig and Munich.

From 1886 to 1892 he worked as a teacher in Darmstadt and Groß-Gerau. In 1885 Dingeldey received his PhD (Promotierung), with primary supervisor Felix Klein and co-supervisor Carl Neumann, from the University of Leipzig with thesis Über die Erzeugung von Curven vierter Ordnung durch Bewegungsmechanismen. In 1889 he completed his habilitation at the TH Darmstadt with a habilitation thesis on knot theory entitled Über einen neuen topologischen Process und die Entstehungsbedingungen einfacher Verbindungen und Knoten in gewissen geschlossenen Flächen. His research followed the work of the Viennese mathematician Oskar Simony. (In 1890 Dingeldey had a pamphlet published with a brief history of topology and basic results on knot theory obtained by various mathematicians.) In 1894 he was elected a member of the Deutsche Akademie der Naturforscher Leopoldina and was appointed a professor ordinarius of mathematics at the TH Darmstadt. There he was from 1903 to 1905 and again in 1919–1920 the rector and in 1932 retired as professor emeritus.

Dingeldey edited the newer editions of the German language translations of George Salmon's textbook on conics (updating earlier editions by Wilhelm Fiedler) and wrote in 1903 the article on conics for the Enzyklopädie der mathematischen Wissenschaften. In 1908 he was an Invited Speaker at the ICM in Rome.

== Selected publications ==
- Topologische Studien über die aus ringförmig geschlossenen Bändern durch gewisse Schnitte erzeugbaren Gebilde, B. G. Teubner, Leipzig 1890 (archive.org, archive.org, archive.org)
- Sammlung von Aufgaben zur Anwendung der Differential- und Integralrechnung, B. G. Teubner, Leipzig Berlin
  - Erster Teil. Aufgaben zur Anwendung der Differentialrechnung, 1910
  - Zweiter Teil. Aufgaben zur Anwendung der Integralrechnung, 1913 (archive.org, archive.org)
- "Zur Erinnerung an Sigmund Gundelfinger". Jahresbericht der Deutschen Mathematiker-Vereinigung. 26: 75–99. 1918.

== Sources ==
- Susann Hensel: Zu einigen Aspekten der Berufung von Mathematikern an die Technischen Hochschulen Deutschlands im letzten Drittel des 19. Jahrhunderts, Annals of Science vol. 46, 1989, p. 387
