= Charles-Ange Laisant =

French politician and mathematician

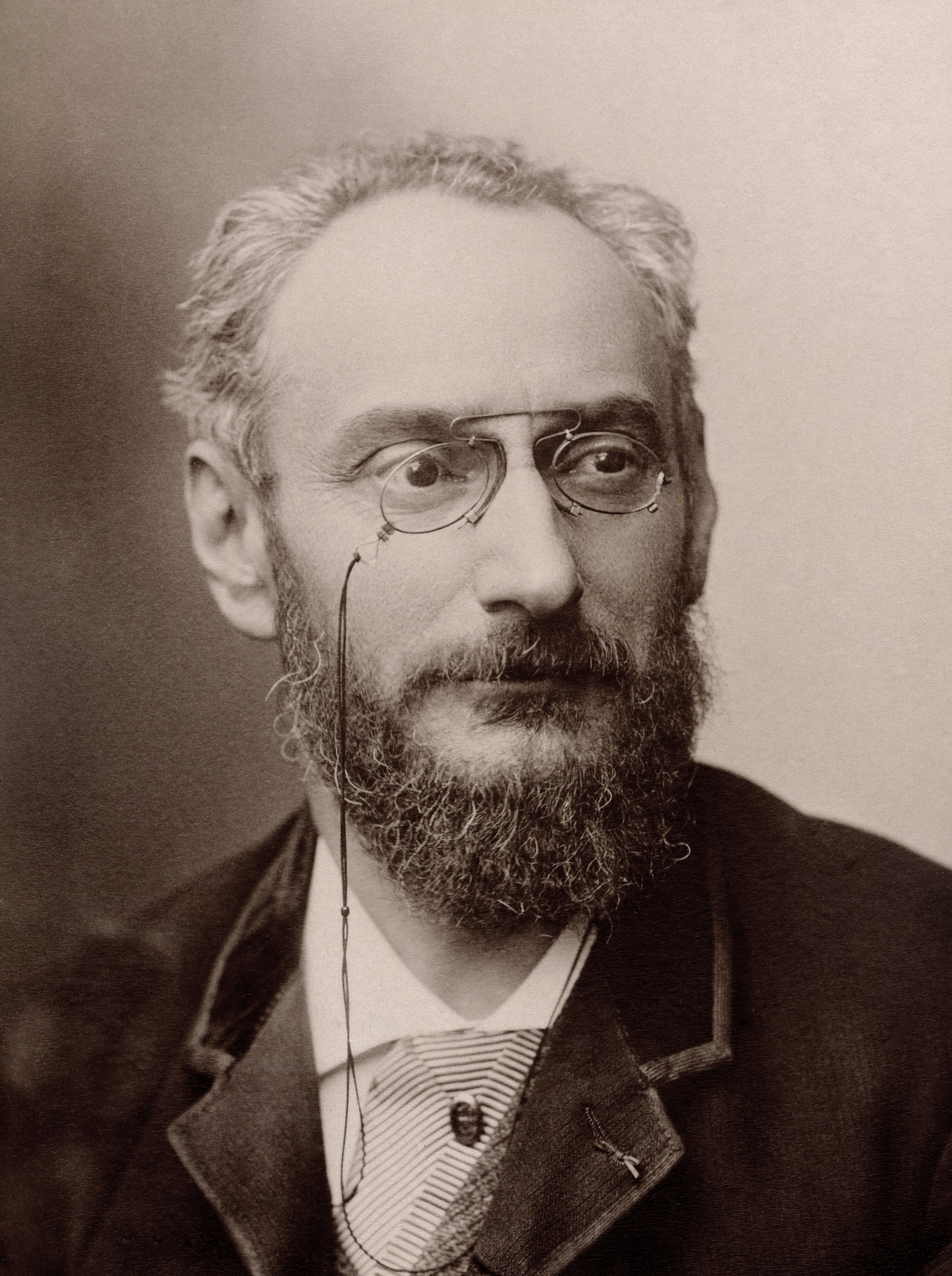
- Born: 1 November 1841; Indre, France
- Died: 5 May 1920 (aged 78)
- Known for: Deputy for Nantes; Quaternion textbook Mathematics journals Integral of inverse functions
- Scientific career
- Fields: Mathematics
- Theses: Applications mécaniques du calcul des quaternions (1877); Sur un nouveau mode de transformation des courbes et des surfaces (1877)

Charles-Ange Laisant (1 November 1841 – 5 May 1920), French politician and mathematician, was born at Indre, near Nantes on 1 November 1841, and was educated at the École Polytechnique as a military engineer. He was a Freemason and a libertarian socialist.

== Politics ==
He defended the fort of Issy at the Siege of Paris, and served in Corsica and in Algeria in 1873. In 1876 he resigned his commission to enter the Chamber as deputy for Nantes in the republican interest, and in 1879 he became director of the Le Petit Parisien. For alleged libel on General Courtot de Cissey in this paper he was heavily fined.

In the Chamber he spoke chiefly on army questions; and was chairman of a commission appointed to consider army legislation, resigning in 1887 on the refusal of the Chamber to sanction the abolition of exemptions of any kind. He then became an adherent of the revisionist policy of General Boulanger and a member of the League of Patriots. Laisant published two political pamphlets, Pourquoi et comment je suis Boulangiste (1887) and L'Anarchie bourgeoise (1887). He was elected Boulangist deputy for the 18th Parisian arrondissement in 1889.

== Mathematics ==
Laisant did not seek re-election in 1893, but devoted himself thenceforward to mathematics. Already in 1874, he published a survey on hyperbolic functions as well as a French translation of Giusto Bellavitis main paper on equipollences into which Laisant added a chapter on hyperbolas. He published two works in geometric algebra, Introduction à la Méthode des Quaternions (1881) and Théorie et applications des equipollences (1887). He also co-founded a mathematical journal, L'Intermédiaire des Mathématiciens with Émile Lemoine in 1894, and was in 1888 the president of the Société Mathématique de France. The quaternion textbook was an abridgement of one by Jules Hoüel, and the text on equipollence further expanded on Bellavitis' methods.

He was attached to the staff of the École Polytechnique, and in 1903–1904 was president of the French Association for the Advancement of Science.

The pedagogical journal, L'Enseignement Mathématique, founded by Laisant and Henri Fehr in 1899, became the official organ of the International Commission on Mathematical Instruction in 1909.

== See also ==
- Laisant's recurrence formula for the ménage numbers
