= Felix Klein Protocols =

Handwritten records of seminar lectures

- Author: Felix Klein
- Genre: Mathematics

"The Felix Klein Protocols" is a collection of handwritten records of the Göttingen seminar lectures of Felix Klein and his school. They span over 8000 pages in 29 volumes, and are regarded as one of the richest records of mathematical activity in modern times. The previously unpublished Klein Protocols were made available digitally in 2006. The collection has been compiled by Eugene Chislenko and Yuri Tschinkel.

A searchable index of the protocols can be found at Felix Klein Protokolle.

== Years covered ==
From 1872 to 1896 Klein conducted his seminars alone, mainly in pure mathematics. The years 1897–1913 show collaborations with mathematicians such as David Hilbert, Karl Schwarzschild, Ludwig Prandtl, Carl Runge and Hermann Minkowski.

Klein Protokolle
Volume	Years	Some topics covered
1	1872–1880	Seminars on various topics in geometry and algebra. (Geometric problems of the 3rd and 4th degree; The physical theory of the northern lights; Rational transformations; Elements of arithmetics; Analytic geometry of space; The imaginary in geometry; On scrolls of degree 4; The elements of function theory; Investigations on algebraic functions; Newtonian and logarithmic potential; The distribution of heat in a sphere; The tautochrone problem.)
2	1880–1881	
3	1881–1882	
4	1882–1883	Hyperelliptic abelian and theta functions.
5	1883–1884	
6	1884–1885	
7	1885–1886	Hyperelliptic functions and the Kummer surface.
8	1886–1887	
9	1887–1889	
10	1889–1892	
11	1892–1894	Number theory. (distribution of primes; Diophantus and his works, quadratic and biquadratic reciprocity, reduction theory of quadratic forms, class numbers.)
12	1894–1896	
13	1896–1898	
14	1898–1899	
15	1899–1900	
16	1900–1901	
17	1901	
18	1901–1902	
19	1902–1903	
20	1903–1904	Hydrodynamics.
21	1904–1905	
22	1905	
23	1905–1906	Automorphic functions.
24	1906	
25	1906–1907	
26	1907	
27	1907–1909	Hydrodynamics seminar with special attention to the hydrodynamics of ships. Ship waves; Ship propellers; Ship resistance in unbounded water.
28	1911	Insurance mathematics.
29	1909–1912	Mathematics and psychology.
