= Henri Fehr =

Swiss mathematician (1870–1954)

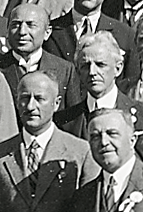
Left to right, background: Julius Wolff, Raymond C. Archibald, foreground: Stefan Straszewicz, Henri Fehr, at the ICM 1932

Henri Fehr (Zurich, 2 February 1870 – Geneva, 2 November 1954) was a Swiss mathematician who was key to the foundation and organisation of national and international mathematical societies and journals. He studied mathematics in Switzerland and France, earning his doctorate at the University of Geneva in 1899 with a thesis on the application of Grassmann's vector methods to differential geometry. In 1910 he co-founded the Swiss Mathematical Society and established its flagship journals, Commentarii Mathematici Helvetici and, with Charles-Ange Laisant, L'Enseignement mathématique, sitting on their editorial and financial committees. Fehr spent his career at the University of Geneva—rising to dean and rector—and from the foundation of the International Commission on Mathematical Instruction in 1908 until his death in 1954 he served as its general secretary; he also held the vice-presidency of the International Mathematical Union from 1924 to 1932.

== Education and the Swiss Mathematical Society ==
Fehr studied mathematics in Switzerland and France, taking his doctorate at the University of Geneva in 1899 with a thesis entitled Application de la Méthode Vectorielle de Grassmann à la Géométrie Infinitésimale (Paris: Georges Carré & C. Naud, 1899; 94 pp.), in which he applied Grassmann's vectorial methods to problems of infinitesimal differential geometry. In May–June 1910 he joined Rudolf Fueter and Marcel Grossmann in issuing the founding appeal for the Swiss Mathematical Society (SMG), serving as its vice-president in 1911–12 and president in 1912–13. He drafted the 700-page report on Swiss mathematical instruction (1910–13) that underpinned the SMG's Foundation for the Advancement of Mathematical Sciences and sat on its editorial and financial committees, securing both federal grants and subscription income. Under SMG auspices he also established the research journal Commentarii Mathematici Helvetici and, with Charles-Ange Laisant, the pedagogical journal L'Enseignement mathématique.

== Academic career and international service ==
Fehr spent his professional life at the University of Geneva, advancing from professor of geometry and algebra to dean, vice-rector and finally rector. A noted pedagogue, he championed the social dimensions of mathematical education and teacher training. From the foundation of ICMI in 1908 until his death in 1954 he served as general secretary of the International Commission on Mathematical Instruction (ICMI), editing its organ L’Enseignement mathématique for 55 years and being elected Honorary President of ICMI in 1952. He was invited to speak at the ICM in Heidelberg (1904), Rome (1908), Cambridge (1912), Toronto (1924), and Zürich (1932).

In June 1928, as Vice-President of the International Mathematical Union (IMU; a post he held 1924–1932) and ICMI general secretary, he was consulted by Ettore Bortolotti—secretary of the Italian Mathematical Union—about objections by IMU Secretary Gabriel Koenigs to the Bologna Congress invitations. Bortolotti's letter makes clear that Fehr's steadfast internationalism ensured mathematicians were invited "sans distinction de nationalité" despite formal protests and the risk of German boycott.

== Publications ==
- Application de la méthode vectorielle de Grassmann à la géométrie infinitésmale. Paris: G. Carré & C. Naud. 1899. 2nd ed. 1907.
- with Théodore Flournoy and Édouard Claparède: Enquête sur la methode de travail des mathématiciens. Paris: Gauthier-Villars. 1908.
- Der Mathematische Unterricht in der Schweiz. Geneva: A. Kündig. 1910.
