= Ivor Grattan-Guinness =

British historian of mathematics (1941–2014)

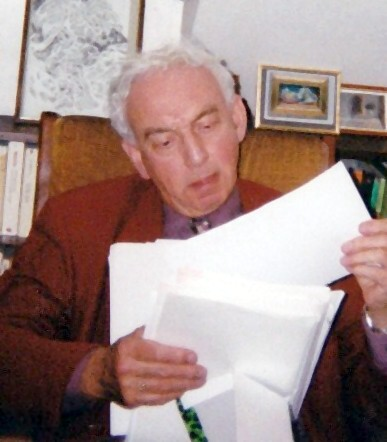
- Ivor Grattan-Guinness in 2003.
- Born: 23 June 1941; Bakewell, England
- Died: 12 December 2014 (aged 73); England
- Education: Wadham College, Oxford; London School of Economics; University of London
- Known for: Research on the history of calculus, analysis, and mathematical logic
- Awards: Kenneth O. May Medal
- Scientific career
- Fields: History of mathematics; History of logic
- Workplaces: Middlesex University; London School of Economics
- Doctoral students: Niccolò Guicciardini

Notes
- He shared his birthday with the mathematician Alan Turing, born 29 years earlier.

Ivor Owen Grattan-Guinness (23 June 1941 – 12 December 2014) was a historian of mathematics and logic.

== Life ==
Grattan-Guinness was born in Bakewell, England; his father was a mathematics teacher and educational administrator. He gained his bachelor's degree as a Mathematics Scholar at Wadham College, Oxford, and an MSc (Econ) in Mathematical Logic and the Philosophy of Science at the London School of Economics in 1966. He gained a doctorate (PhD) in 1969 and a higher doctorate (D.Sc.) in 1978, both in the History of Science, at the University of London. He was Emeritus Professor of the History of Mathematics and Logic at Middlesex University, and a Visiting Research Associate at the London School of Economics.

He was awarded the Kenneth O. May Medal for services to the History of Mathematics by the International Commission on the History of Mathematics (ICHM) on 31 July 2009, at Budapest, on the occasion of the 23rd International Congress for the History of Science. In 2010, he was elected an Honorary Member of the Bertrand Russell Society.

Grattan-Guinness spent much of his career at Middlesex University. He was a fellow at the Institute for Advanced Study in Princeton, New Jersey, United States, and a member of the International Academy of the History of Science.

From 1974 to 1981, Grattan-Guinness was editor of the history of science journal Annals of Science. In 1979 he founded the journal History and Philosophy of Logic, and edited it until 1992. He was an associate editor of Historia Mathematica for twenty years from its inception in 1974, and again from 1996.

He also acted as advisory editor to the editions of the writings of C.S. Peirce and Bertrand Russell, and to several other journals and book series. He was a member of the Executive Committee of the International Commission on the History of Mathematics from 1977 to 1993.

Grattan-Guinness gave over 570 invited lectures to organisations, societies, conferences and congresses in over 20 countries, including lecture tours in Australia, New Zealand, Italy, South Africa and Portugal.

From 1986 to 1988, Grattan-Guinness was the President of the British Society for the History of Mathematics, and in 1992 its Vice-President. In 1991, he was elected an effective member of the Académie Internationale d'Histoire des Sciences. He was the Associate Editor for mathematicians and statisticians for the Oxford Dictionary of National Biography (2004).

Grattan-Guinness took an interest in the phenomenon of coincidence and wrote on it for the Society for Psychical Research. He claimed to have a recurrent affinity with the number 225, the square of 15, and recounted an occasion when the car in front of him bore the number plate IGG225, combining his initials with that number. He died of heart failure on 12 December 2014, aged 73, survived by his wife Enid Grattan-Guinness.

The personal papers of Grattan-Guinness are preserved at the Archives of American Mathematics. His offprint collection is held by the American Institute of Mathematics.

== Work ==
The work of Grattan-Guinness touched on all historical periods, but he specialised in the development of the calculus and mathematical analysis, and their applications to mechanics and mathematical physics, and in the rise of set theory and mathematical logic. He was especially interested in characterising how past thinkers, far removed in time, viewed their findings differently from the way they are seen today (for example, Euclid). He emphasised the importance of ignorance as an epistemological notion in this task. He did extensive research with original sources, both published and unpublished, aided by his fluency in the major European languages.

== Selected publications ==
=== Books written ===
- 1970. The Development of the Foundations of Mathematical Analysis from Euler to Riemann. MIT Press. LCCN 75-110228 ISBN 0262070340
- 1972. Joseph Fourier, 1768–1830 (In collaboration with J.R. Ravetz). MIT Press. LCCN 76-128538 ISBN 0262070413
- 1977. Dear Russell—Dear Jourdain: a Commentary on Russell's Logic, Based on His Correspondence with Philip Jourdain. Duckworth. LCCN 77-9431 ISBN 0231044607
- 1980. From the Calculus to Set Theory, 1630–1910: An Introductory History (with chapters written by H. J. M. Bos et al.). Duckworth. LCCN 80-489901 ISBN 0715612956
- 1982. Psychical Research: A Guide to Its History, Principles & Practices - in celebration of 100 years of the Society for Psychical Research, Aquarian Press, ISBN 0-85030-316-8 .
- 1990. Convolutions in French Mathematics, 1800–1840 in 3 Vols. Birkhauser. LCCN 89-17635 ISBN 0817622403
- 1997. The Fontana History of the Mathematical Sciences: The Rainbow of Mathematics. Fontana Press. ISBN 978-0-00-686179-9 (pbk). Norton History of the Mathematical Sciences. W. W. Norton and Company (1998). ISBN 978-0-393-04650-2 (hbk), ISBN 0-393-32030-8 (pbk).
- 1997. Pierre-Simon Laplace. Princeton University Press. ISBN 978-0-691-01185-1. With Charles Coulston Gillispie and Robert Fox.
- 2000. (Reprint) From the Calculus to Set Theory 1630–1910: An Introductory History (ed. by I. Grattan-Guiness with chapters written by H. J. M. Bos, R. Bunn, J. W. Dauben, I. Grattan-Guinness, T. W. Hawkins, & K. Møller Pederson). Princeton University Press. ISBN 0-691-07082-2.
- 2000. The Search for Mathematical Roots, 1870–1940: Logics, Set Theories, and the Foundations of Mathematics from Cantor through Russell to Gödel. Princeton University Press. ISBN 0-691-05858-X. Bibliography. (For research on this book he held a Leverhulme Fellowship from 1995 to 1997.)
- 2009 Routes of Learning: Highways, Pathways, and Byways in the History of Mathematics. Johns Hopkins University Press. ISBN 0-8018-9248-1.

=== Editions ===
- W.H. and G.C. Young, The theory of sets of points, 2nd edition (ed. with R.C.H. Tanner; 1972, New York: Chelsea). [Introduction and appendix.]
- E.L. Post, "The modern paradoxes", History and philosophy of logic, 11 (1990), 85–91.
- Philip E. B. Jourdain, Selected essays on the history of set theory and logics (1906–1918), (1991, Bologna: CLUEB), xlii + 352 pages. [Introduction and indexes.]
- George Boole, Selected manuscripts on logic and its philosophy (ed. with G. Bornet, 1997, Basel: Birkhäuser), lxvi + 236 pages.[Part Introduction and editorial material.]
- Grattan-Guinness' The Search for Mathematical Roots 1870–1940 is a sweeping study of the rise of mathematical logic during that critical period. The central theme of the book is the rise of logicism, thanks to the efforts of Frege, Bertrand Russell, and Alfred Whitehead, and its demise due to Gödel and indifference. Whole chapters are devoted to the emergence of algebraic logic in the 19th century UK, Cantor and the emergence of set theory, the emergence of mathematical logic in Germany told in a way that downplays Frege's importance, and to Peano and his followers. There follow four chapters devoted to the ideas of the young Bertrand Russell, the writing of both The Principles of Mathematics and Principia Mathematica, and to the mixed reception the ideas and methods encountered over the period 1910–40. The book touches on the rise of model theory as well as proof theory, and on the emergence of American research on the foundation of mathematics, especially in the hands of E. H. Moore and his students, of the postulate theorists, and of Quine. While Polish logic is often mentioned, it is not covered systematically. Finally, the book is a contribution to the history of philosophy as well as of mathematics.

=== Books edited ===
- 2003. Companion Encyclopedia of the History and Philosophy of the Mathematical Sciences, 2 vols. Johns Hopkins University Press. ISBN 0-8018-7396-7
- 2005. Landmark Writings in Western Mathematics 1640-1940. Elsevier. ISBN 0-444-50871-6

=== Articles ===
- 1975. "Mathematical Bibliography for W. H. and G. C. Young." Historia Mathematica, Vol. 2, No. 1, February 1975, pp. 43-58.
- 1978. "How Bertrand Russell Discovered His Paradox." Historia Mathematica, Vol. 5, No. 2, May 1978, pp. 127-137.
- 1989. "The Earliest Contribution to Location Theory? Spatio-economic Equilibrium with Lamé and Clapeyron, 1829." Mathematics and Computers in Simulation, Vol. 31, No. 3, July 1986, pp. 195-220.
- 1990. "The Varieties of Mechanics by 1800." Historia Mathematica, Vol. 17, No. 4, November 1990, pp. 313-338.
- 1992. "A Note on The Educational Times and Mathematical Questions" Historia Mathematica, Vol. 19, No. 1, February 1992, pp. 76-78.
- 1994. "Contributing to the Educational Times: Letters to W.J.C. Miller." Historia Mathematica, Vol. 21, No. 2, May 1994, pp. 204-205.
- 1996. "Mozart 18, Beethoven 32: Hidden Shadows of Integers in Classical Music", pages 29 to 48 in History of Mathematics: States of the Art, edited by Joseph W. Dauben, Menso Folkerts, Eberhard Knobloch and Hans Wussing, Academic Press ISBN 0-12-204055-4
- 1996. "Numbers, Magnitudes, Ratios, and Proportions in Euclid's Elements: How Did He Handle Them?" Historia Mathematica, Vol. 23, No. 4, November 1996, pp. 355-375.
- 2000. "Christianity and Mathematics: Kinds of Link and the Rare Occurrences after 1750." Physis: Rivista Internazionale di Storia della Scienza XXXVII. Nuova Serie. Fasc. 2. 2000: 467–500.
- 2001. "Manifestations of Mathematics in and around the Christianities: Some Examples and Issues." Historia Scientiarum 11-1. July 2001: 48–84.
- 2002. A Sideways Look at Hilbert's Twenty-Three Problems of 1900, Notices of the American Mathematical Society 47: 752–57.
- 2002. "Algebras, Projective Geometry, Mathematical Logic, and Constructing the World: Intersections in the Philosophy of Mathematics of A. N. Whitehead." Historia Mathematica, Vol. 29, No. 4, November 2002, pp. 427-462.
- 2004. "The Mathematics of the Past: Distinguishing Its History From Our Heritage." Historia Mathematica, Vol. 31, No. 2, May 2004, pp. 163-185.
- 2008. "Foundations of Mathematics and Logicism," in Michel Weber and Will Desmond (eds.), Handbook of Whiteheadian Process Thought, Frankfurt / Lancaster, Ontos Verlag: 97-104. Cf. Michel Weber, « Ivor Grattan-Guinness, "Algebras, Projective Geometry, Mathematical Logic, and Constructing the World. Intersections in the Philosophy of Mathematics of A.N. Whitehead", Historia Mathematica 29, N° 4, 2002, pp. 427-462 », Zentralblatt MATH, European Mathematical Society, Fachinformationszentrum Karlsruhe & Springer-Verlag, 1046.00003.
- 2014. "From Anomaly to Fundament: Louis Poinsot's Theories of the Couple in Mechanics." Historia Mathematica, Vol. 41, No. 1, February 2014, pp. 82-102.
