= Lam Lay Yong =

Mathematician

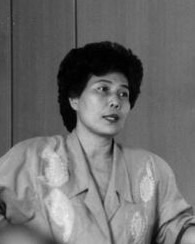
Lam Lay Yong in 1978

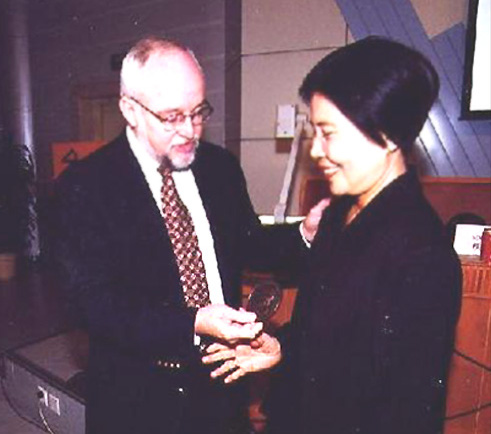
Joseph Dauben presenting the fourth Kenneth O. May Prize to Lam Lay Yong at the International Congress of Mathematics in Beijing, China, 2002

Lam Lay Yong (maiden name Oon Lay Yong, Chinese: 蓝丽蓉; pinyin: Lán Lìróng; born 1936) is a retired Professor of Mathematics.

== Academic career ==
From 1988 to 1996 she was Professor at the Department of Mathematics, National University of Singapore (NUS). She graduated from the University of Malaya (later becoming University of Singapore) in 1957 and pursued graduate study in Cambridge University, obtaining her Ph.D. degree from University of Singapore in 1966, and becoming a lecturer at the University of Singapore. She was promoted to full professor in 1988, taught in NUS for 35 years, and retired in 1996.

From 1974 to 1990, Lam Lay Yong was the associate editor of Historia Mathematica. Lam was a member of Académie Internationale d'Histoire des Sciences.

In 2001, Lam Lay Yong was awarded the Kenneth O. May Prize jointly with Ubiratan D'Ambrosio. Lam was the first Asian and first woman to receive this award. Her reception speech was Ancient Chinese Mathematics and its influence on World Mathematics.

Lam Lay Yong also won the 2005 Outstanding Science Alumni Award from NUS. She is the granddaughter of Tan Kah Kee and niece of Lee Kong Chian.

== Chinese origins of Hindu-Arabic Numerals Hypothesis ==
Lam Lay Yong has hypothesised that the Hindu–Arabic numeral system originated in China. This is based on her comparative studies of the Chinese counting rod system. She states that the rod numerals and the Hindu numerals have a few features in common. These include the nine signs, the concept of zero, a place value system, and a decimal base. She writes that "While no one knows how the Hindu-Arabic system originated in India, on the other hand, there is strong evidence of a transmission of the concept of the rod system to India." She states that there is no unquestionable evidence that the system originated in India, and that there are two factors concerning this. One comes from mentions by mathematicians, for example, a critique by Severus Sebokht on Indian ingenuity, and Al-Khwarizmi's book on Hindu calculation. The other factor is the presence of Brahmi numerals.

== Publication ==
- Jiu Zhang Suanshu (1994) "(Nine Chapters on the Mathematical Art): An Overview, Archive for History of Exact Sciences, vol. 47: pp. 1–51.
- Zhang Qiujian Suanjing (1997) "(The Mathematical Classic of Zhang Qiujian): An Overview", Archive for History of Exact Sciences, vol. 50: pp. 201–240.
- Lam Lay Yong, Ang Tian Se (2004) Fleeting Footsteps. Tracing the Conception of Arithmetic and Algebra in Ancient China, Revised Edition, World Scientific, Singapore.
- Lam Lay Yong (1977) A Critical Study of the Yang Hui suan fa, NUS Press.
- Lam Lay Yong, "A Chinese Genesis, Rewriting the history of our numeral system", Archive for History of Exact Sciences 38: 101–108.
- Lam Lay Yong (1966) "On the Chinese Origin of the Galley Method of Arithmetical Division", The British Journal for the History of Science 3: 66–69 Cambridge University Press.
- Lam Lay Yong (1996) "The Development of Hindu-Arabic and Traditional Chinese Arithmetic", Chinese Science 13: 35–54.
- Oon Lay Yong (2009) Arithmetic in Ancient China OCT October 2009.
- Lam Lay-Yong and Shen Kangshen (沈康身) (1989) "Methods of solving linear equations in traditional China", Historia Mathematica, Volume 16, Issue 2, Pages 107–122.
