= Karin Reich =

German historian of mathematics (born 1941)

- Born: 13 October 1941 (age 84); Munich
- Education: LMU Munich
- Scientific career
- Fields: Mathematics
- Workplaces: Heidelberg University; University of Stuttgart; University of Hamburg
- Doctoral advisor: Helmuth Gericke

Karin Anna Reich is a German historian of mathematics.

== Career ==
From 1967 to 1973 Reich was a scientific assistant at the Research Institute of the Deutsches Museum in Munich and the Institute for the History of Mathematics and Natural Sciences at LMU Munich, where in 1973, she graduated under supervision of Helmuth Gericke. In 1980, she completed her time in Munich, publishing The development of tensor calculus, in 1994 in a revised form as a book.

In 1980, she became Professor of the History of Natural Science and Engineering at the Stuttgart College of Librarianship. In 1980/81 and 1981/82 she had a teaching assignment for the History of Mathematics at Heidelberg University. In 1981, she represented the Department of History of Science at the University of Hamburg. In 1982, she became associate professor and in 1988 Professor for History of Mathematics at the University of Stuttgart. From 1994 until her retirement, she was a professor at the Institute for the History of Natural Science, Mathematics and Engineering at the University of Hamburg, where she succeeded Christoph J. Scriba as director.

== Recognition ==
Reich is a corresponding member of the Göttingen Academy of Sciences and Humanities.

== Selected publications ==
Reich's publications include biographies of Carl Friedrich Gauss, Michael Stifel and François Viète. With Gericke, Reich produced an annotated translation of Viète's Analyticam In artem Isagoge from 1591. She wrote a history of vector-and tensor and differential geometry. With Kurt Vogel, Gericke and Reich reissued Johannes Tropfke's history of elementary mathematics.

Reich's books include:

- Maß, Zahl und Gewicht: Mathematik als Schlüssel zu Weltverständnis und Weltbeherrschung [Measure, number and weight: Mathematics as key to understanding and mastering the world] (with Menso Folkerts and Eberhard Knobloch, VCH, Acta Humaniora, Weinheim, 1989)
- Die Entwicklung des Tensorkalküls: Vom absoluten Differentialkalkül zur Relativitätstheorie [The development of tensor calculus: From the absolute differential calculus to relativity theory] (Birkhäuser, 1994)
- Im Umfeld der "Theoria motus": Gauß' Briefwechsel mit Perthes, Laplace, Delambre und Legendre [On matters having to do with the "Theoria motus": Gauss' correspondence with Perthes, Laplace, Delambre and Legendre] (Vandenhoeck & Ruprecht, 2001)
- Carl Friedrich Gauß und Russland: Sein Briefwechsel mit in Russland wirkenden Wissenschaftlern [Carl Friedrich Gauss and Russia: His correspondence with scientists working in Russia] (with Elena Roussanova, De Gruyter, 2012)
- Carl Friedrich Gauß und Christopher Hansteen: Der Briefwechsel beider Gelehrten im historischen Kontext [Carl Friedrich Gauss and Christopher Hansteen:A correspondence between two scholars in historical context] (with Elena Roussanova, De Gruyter, 2015)
