= Christoph Scriba =

German historian of mathematics

Christoph J. Scriba (6 October 1929 – 26 July 2013) was a German historian of mathematics.

== Life and work ==
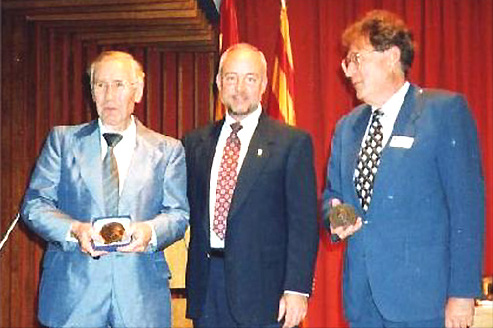
Christoph Scriba, Joseph Dauben, and Hans Wussing at the 19th International Congress of History of Science in Zaragoza, Spain 1993

Scriba was born in Darmstadt and studied at Justus-Liebig-University Giessen. He read James Gregory's early writings on the calculus with Joseph Ehrenfried Hofmann, and was awarded his doctorate in 1957. Continuing with J.E. Hofmann, and with Bernard Sticker, he investigated the papers of John Wallis in Oxford in 1966, contributing to Studies on the Mathematics of John Wallis.

Scriba then taught at the University of Kentucky, the University of Massachusetts and at the University of Toronto from 1959 to 1962. He became chairman of Technische Universität Berlin's department of History of Mathematics in 1969. Then in 1975 he became Professor of History of Natural Science and Mathematics at the University of Hamburg and Director of the Institute until he retired in 1995. His successor there was Karin Reich.

Scriba was on the Executive Committee of the International Commission on the History of Mathematics and its president from 1977 to 1985. He was a member of Jungius company in Hamburg, the Leopoldina, the International Academy of the History of Science, and since 1995 the Göttingen Academy of Sciences. In 1993 he was awarded the Kenneth O. May Prize of the ICHM. He was the doctorate advisor of Eberhard Knobloch. He died in July 2013 in Hamburg.

== Writings ==
- 1966: Studies on the mathematics of John Wallis (1616–1703): Angular divisions, combining theory and number theory problems. Appendix: the books and manuscripts of Valais . Wiesbaden (habilitation)
- 1968: The Concept of Number: A chapter in the history of mathematics, with applications of interest to teachers, BI university paperback
- 2003: (editor with Philip Beeley) The Correspondence of John Wallis, volume 1 (1641 to 59), 2005: volume 2 (1660 to September 1668), 2012: volume 3 (October 1668 to 71) Oxford University Press

== Literature ==
- Joseph W. Dauben (and other editors) (1996) History of mathematics. State of the Art Flores quadrivii. Studies in Honor of Christoph J. Scriba, Academic Press, ISBN 0-12-204055-4 .
- Joseph Dauben (2002) Writing the History of Mathematics—its historic development, Birkhauser
- Peter Schreiber (2004) Geometry 5000 years – history, culture, people, Springer
- Edward Seidler, Wieland Berg (Editors) (1995) The Elite of the Nation in the Third Reich – The ratio of scientific academies and their environment to Nazism, Leopoldina symposium, Hall
