= Johannes Tropfke =

German mathematician and teacher

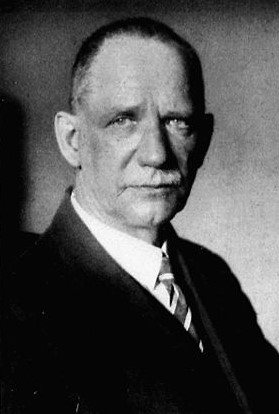
- Born: 14 October 1866; Berlin
- Died: 10 November 1939 (aged 73); Berlin
- Education: university in Berlin, University of Halle (PhD)
- Occupations: mathematician, teacher, Berlin council member
- Known for: history of mathematics
- Notable work: Geschichte der Elementarmathematik
- Political party: German People's Party
- Spouse: Frida Thyssen
- Children: 1 son, 1 daughter
- Father: Franz Tropfke
- Awards: one of the first members of the International Academy of the History of Science, Leibniz medal

Johannes Tropfke (14 October 1866 – 10 November 1939) was a German mathematician and teacher, who is best remembered for his influential work on the history of mathematics Geschichte der Elementarmathematik, which consists of seven volumes.

== Life ==
Tropfke was born in Berlin at Marienstraße 14 as the older of two sons of the cabinet maker Franz Tropfke. The house in which Tropfke was born was built by his grandfather Franz Joseph Tropfke around 1830 and is one of the few houses in the area that was not destroyed during World War II. Tropfke grew up in Berlin and after his graduation from the Friedrichs-Gymnasium (high school) in 1884 he attended the university in Berlin to study sciences and mathematics. In 1889 he was awarded a degree to teach math and sciences at gymnasiums (high schools). Later he earned a PhD in mathematics from the University of Halle for a thesis on elliptic integrals (Zur Darstellung des elliptischen Integrales erster Gattung), his advisor was Lazarus Fuchs.

Tropfke first worked as teacher at the Friedrichs-Realgymnasium and at the Realgymnasium of Dorotheenstadt and in 1913 he became the principal of the newly founded Kirschner-Oberrealschule in Moabit. Tropfke stayed on in this position until his retirement in 1932. In 1907 he was awarded the title of a professor. He was one of the first members of the International Academy of the History of Science and in 1939 he was awarded the Leibniz medal by the Prussian Academy of Sciences.

Aside from his work in education and mathematics Tropfke also had a career in local politics. He was a member of the German People's Party and served as council member for the city of Berlin from 1907 to 1920.

Tropfke married Frida Thyssen. The couple had a son Erich, who perished in World War I, and a daughter Elisabeth. Tropfke died on 10 November 1939 in the very same house in which he was born.

== Work ==
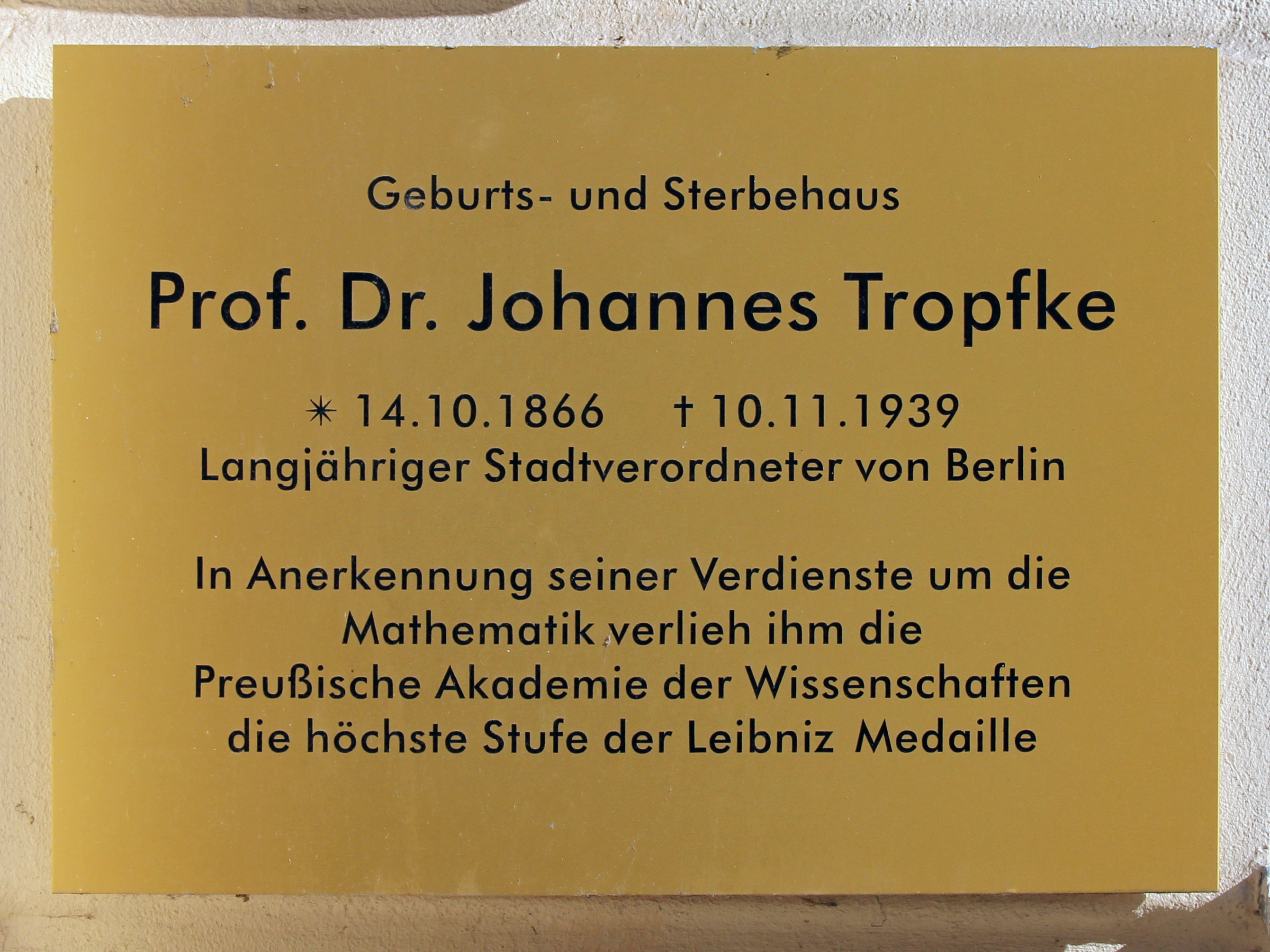
memorial plaque at Marienstraße 14

Tropfke's most important contributions were in the history of mathematics. His seminal work Geschichte der Elementarmathematik originally consisted of two volumes, when it was first published in 1902 and 1903. Later it got expanded into seven volumes for its second edition (1921-1924). For this second edition Tropfke was supported by the mathematicians and historians Gustaf Eneström, Julius Ruska and Heinrich Wieleitner. To incorporate the latest research Tropfke published revised third editions of the first three volumes in the 1930s. After his death the mathematician Kurt Vogel completed the third edition of the fourth volume in 1940. The structure and focus of Tropfke's work differed somewhat from most work in the history of mathematics at the time. Instead of structuring the material chronologically with a focus on the biography of mathematicians, Tropfke selected to organize it by mathematical fields and then focused on the development of concepts and terminology in those fields rather than on biographical aspects. In particular with its second edition Tropfke's Geschichte der Elementarmathematik was also one of the most extensive compilations on the history of mathematics, which led to it becoming a well known and influential reference work.

The publication of a fourth revised edition under the direction of Kurt Vogel, Karin Reich and Helmuth Gericke began from 1980 onwards, more than 40 years after Tropfke's death.

In 1930 Tropfke received the Ackermann–Teubner Memorial Award for his second edition of Geschichte der Elementarmathematik.
