= Sonja Brentjes =

German historian of mathematics and arabist (born 1951)

Sonja Brentjes (born 1951) is a German historian of science, historian of mathematics, and historian of cartography known for her work on mapmapking and mathematics in medieval Islam.

== Education and career ==
Brentjes is the daughter of archaeologists, orientalists, and Islamists Burchard Brentjes and Helga Wilke Brentjes.

She earned a diploma in mathematics from TU Dresden in 1973 and completed her doctorate (Dr. rer. nat.) there in 1977. Her doctoral dissertation, Untersuchungen zur Geschichte der linearen Optimierung von den Anfängen zur Konstituierung als selbständige mathematische Theorie - eine Studie zum Problem der Entstehung mathematischer Disziplinen im 20. Jahrhundert, concerned the history of linear programming, and was supervised by Hans Wussing. She earned a second diploma in Near Eastern studies in 1982 from Martin Luther University of Halle-Wittenberg, a second doctorate (Dr. sc. nat.) from Leipzig University in 1989, and a habilitation from Leipzig University in 1991.

She worked as an assistant professor in the Karl Sudhoff Institute for the History of Medicine and Sciences at Leipzig University from 1976 to 1997, with tenure beginning in 1980. After holding a sequence of research positions at the Max Planck Institute for the History of Science, Institute for the History of Science at Goethe University Frankfurt, and University of Oklahoma, she became an associate professor at the Aga Khan University Institute for the Study of Muslim Civilisations in 2004. Since 2007 she has been a researcher at LMU Munich, the University of Seville, and the Max Planck Institute for the History of Science, where she has been affiliated since 2012.

== Recognition ==
Brentjes became a corresponding member of the International Academy of the History of Science in 1995, and a full member in 2002. She received one of the two Kenneth O. May Prize medals awarded by the International Commission on the History of Mathematics on 26 July 2021 at the International Congress for History and Philosophy of Science in Prague.

== Books ==
Brentjes' books include:

- Ibn Sina (Avicenna): Der fürstliche Meister aus Buchara (with Burchard Brentjes, Teubner, 1979)
- Travellers from Europe in the Ottoman and Safavid Empires, 16th–17th Centuries: Seeking, Transforming, Discarding Knowledge (Ashgate, 2010)
- Globalization of Knowledge in the Post-Antique Mediterranean, 700–1500 (edited with Jürgen Renn, Routledge, 2016)
- 1001 Distortions: How (Not) to Narrate History of Science, Medicine, and Technology in Non-Western Cultures (edited with Taner Edis and Lutz Richter-Bernburg, Ergon Verlag, 2016)
- Teaching and Learning the Sciences in Islamicate Societies (800–1700) (Brepols, 2018)
