= Theaetetus =

Theaetetus (Θεαίτητος) is a Greek name which may refer to:

== People ==
- Theaetetus (mathematician) (c. 417 BC–369 BC), Greek geometer
- Theaetetus (poet) (fl. 3rd century BC), Greek poet
- Theaetetus of Cyrene (Θεαίτητος ὁ Κυρηναῖος) (fl. 270 BC), Greek poet
- Theaetetus Scholasticus (Θεαίτητος ὁ σχολαστικός) (fl. 6th century AD), Greek poet

== Other uses ==
- Theaetetus (dialogue), a dialogue by Plato, named after the geometer
- Theaetetus (crater), a lunar impact crater
