= Jan Hogendijk =

Dutch mathematician and historian of science (born 1955)

- Born: 21 July 1955 (age 71); Leeuwarden, Friesland
- Education: University of Utrecht
- Awards: Otto Neugebauer Prize (2012); Kenneth O. May Prize (2025)
- Scientific career
- Fields: Mathematics
- Workplaces: University of Utrecht; Leiden University; University of Heidelberg
- Doctoral advisor: Fred van der Blij; Gerald J. Toomer

Jan Pieter Hogendijk (born 21 July 1955) is a Dutch mathematician and historian of science. Since 2005, he is professor of history of mathematics at the University of Utrecht.

Hogendijk became a member of the Royal Netherlands Academy of Arts and Sciences in 2010.

Hogendijk has contributed to the study of Greek mathematics and mathematics in medieval Islam; he provides a list of Sources on his website (below). In 2012, he was awarded the inaugural Otto Neugebauer Prize for History of Mathematics, by the European Mathematical Society, "for having illuminated how Greek mathematics was absorbed in the medieval Arabic world, how mathematics developed in medieval Islam, and how it was eventually transmitted to Europe."

A bibliography of Hogendijk's publications is included in his website.

== Selected works ==
- Hogendijk, Jan P. (1986). "Arabic traces of lost works of Apollonius". Archive for History of Exact Sciences. 35 (3). Springer Science and Business Media LLC: 187–253. doi:10.1007/bf00357307. ISSN 0003-9519. S2CID 121613986.
- Hogendijk, Jan P (1987). "Observations on the icosahedron in Euclid's Elements". Historia Mathematica. 14 (2). Elsevier BV: 175–177. doi:10.1016/0315-0860(87)90022-x. ISSN 0315-0860. S2CID 123141534.
- Hogendijk, Jan P (1989). "Sharaf al-Dīn al-Ṫūsī on the number of positive roots of cubic equations". Historia Mathematica. 16 (1). Elsevier BV: 69–85. doi:10.1016/0315-0860(89)90099-2. ISSN 0315-0860.
- Hogendijk, Jan P. (1991). "Desargues' Brouillon Project and the Conics of Apollonius". Centaurus. 34 (1). Brepols Publishers NV: 1–43. Bibcode:1991Cent...34....1H. doi:10.1111/j.1600-0498.1991.tb00687.x. ISSN 0008-8994.
- 1994: "B.L. van der Waerden's detective work in ancient and medieval mathematical astronomy", Nieuw Archief voor Wiskunde Vierde Serie 12(3): 145–58.
- Hogendijk, Jan P. (1995). "Mathematics in Medieval Islamic Spain". Proceedings of the International Congress of Mathematicians. Basel: Birkhäuser Basel. pp. 1568–1580. doi:10.1007/978-3-0348-9078-6_154. ISBN 978-3-0348-9897-3.
- 2008: "The Introduction to Geometry by Qusta ibn Luqa: translation and commentary", Suhayl 8: 163–221.
