= Canadian Society for History and Philosophy of Mathematics =

The Canadian Society for History and Philosophy of Mathematics (CSHPM) is dedicated to the study of the history and philosophy of mathematics in Canada. It was proposed by Kenneth O. May, in conjunction with the journal Historia Mathematica, and was founded in 1974.

== See also ==
- Canadian Mathematical Society
- List of Mathematical Societies
