= Kenneth O. May Prize =

Award in the field of mathematics

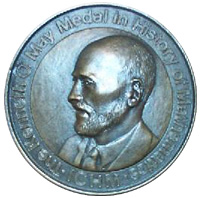

Kenneth O. May Prize and Medal in history of mathematics is an award of the International Commission on the History of Mathematics (ICHM) "for the encouragement and promotion of the history of mathematics internationally". It was established in 1989 and is named in honor of Kenneth O. May, the founder of ICHM. Since then, the award is given every four years, at the ICHM congress.

== Kenneth O. May Prize winners ==
Source: (1989-2005) A Brief History of the Kenneth O. May Prize

- 2025: Jan Hogendijk and David E. Rowe
- 2021: Sonja Brentjes and Christine Proust
- 2017: Eberhard Knobloch and Roshdi Rashed
- 2013: Menso Folkerts and Jens Høyrup
- 2009: Ivor Grattan-Guinness and Radha Charan Gupta
- 2005: Henk J. M. Bos
- 2001: Ubiratàn D'Ambrosio and Lam Lay Yong
- 1997: René Taton
- 1993: Christoph Scriba and Hans Wussing
- 1989: Dirk Struik and Adolph P. Yushkevich

== See also ==
- List of history awards
- List of mathematics awards
