= Eberhard Knobloch =

German historian of mathematics (born 1943)

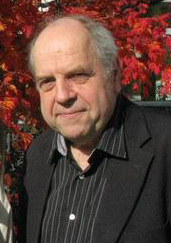
Knobloch in 2009 at MFO

Eberhard Knobloch (born 6 November 1943) is a German historian of science and mathematics.

== Career ==
Knobloch was born in Görlitz. From 1962 to 1967 he studied classics and mathematics at FU Berlin and Technische Universität Berlin, after which he passed his state examination as a high school teacher. He taught ancient languages at Goethe-Gymnasium (Berlin-Wilmersdorf). Previous to 1970 he had been a research assistant in the history of science at TU Berlin. There he studied with Christoph Scriba, and with a thesis on Leibniz's combinators, Knobloch received his doctorate in 1972.

From 1973 he was professor of mathematics at the College of Education in Berlin. In 1976 he qualified as a professor in Berlin and was a visiting scholar at Oxford, London and Edinburgh. Since 1976 he is head of the math sections of the Academy edition of the works of Gottfried Wilhelm Leibniz (and later the technical-scientific parts). In 1981 he became professor of history of science at Technische Universität Berlin (since 2002 academy professor); retiring in 2009. In 1984 he was a visiting professor at the Russian Academy of Sciences in Leningrad. Since 1999 he has been a regular guest professor at Northwestern Polytechnical University in Xian, China. He also was a visiting professor at the Ecole Normale Supérieure in Paris.

Besides the Leibniz Edition, he also oversaw the Tschirnhaus edition of the Saxon Academy of Sciences and worked at Kepler with edition. He is also director of the Alexander von Humboldt Research Centre of the Berlin-Brandenburg Academy of Sciences. He also dealt with Renaissance technology (such as military engineer Mariano Taccola), the notebooks of Leonhard Euler and Jesuit scholars like Christopher Clavius. Knobloch assisted the Dieter Lelgemann surveyors to decode and interpret the Ptolemy chart with Susudata.

He is a member of the International Academy of the History of Science in Paris (corresponding member since 1984, member since 1988, 2001 to 2005 as Vice President and later its president). Since 1996, a member of the Leopoldina, corresponding member of the Saxon Academy of Sciences, Member of Academia Scientiarum et Artium Europaea since 1997 and the Berlin-Brandenburg Academy of Sciences . From 2001 to 2005 he was president of the German National Committee for the History of Science. In 2004 he was elected president of the European Society for the History of Science for 2006–2008. Knobloch, along with Roshdi Rashed, won the 2017 Kenneth O. May Prize of The International Commission on the History of Mathematics.

== Writings ==
- Die mathematischen Studien von G. W. Leibniz zur Kombinatorik (The mathematical studies of G.W. Leibniz on combinatorics) Studia Leibnitiana Supplementa, vol. 11, 1973 (vol. 1 of 2); vol. 16, 1976 (vol. 2 of 2). OCLC 913924 LCCN 74-313201 (in German)
- Der Beginn der Determinantentheorie. Leibniz nachgelassene Studien zum Determinantenkalkül (The beginning of the theory of determinants. Leibniz posthumous studies on determinants of calculus). Hildesheim in 1980, Arbor Scientiarum B, vol.2. (in German) LCCN 80-500516 ISBN 3806708274
- L'art de la guerre : Machines et stratagèmes de Taccola, ingénieur de la Renaissance, coll. "Découvertes Gallimard Albums", Paris: Gallimard, 1992.
- with Menso Folkerts, Karin Reich: Mass, Zahl und Gewicht: Mathematik als Schlüssel zu Weltverständnis und Weltbeherrschung (Mass, number and weight: Mathematics as the key to world understanding and world domination); 2nd edition Wiesbaden 2001. LCCN 90-131509 ISBN 352717821X
- Leibniz, Gottfried Wilhelm (2004). Quadrature arithmétique du cercle, de l'ellipse et de l'hyperbole et la trigonométrie sans tables trigonométriques qui en est le corollaire. ISBN 978-2-7116-1635-0; introduction, translation from the original Latin, & notes by Marc Parmentier; Latin text edited by Eberhart Knobloch
- Johannes Kepler: Nova stereometria doliorum vinariorum / New solid geometry of wine barrels. Accessit stereometriæ Archimedeæ supplementum / A supplement to the Archimedean solid geometry has been added. Edited and translated, with an Introduction, by Eberhard Knobloch. Paris: Les Belles Lettres, 2018. ISBN 978-2-251-44832-9.

Professional and academic associations
Preceded by Claude Debru & Robert Fox	President of the European Society for the History of Science; 2006–2008	Succeeded by Helge Kragh
