= Ubiratan D'Ambrosio =

Brazilian historian of mathematics (1932–2021)

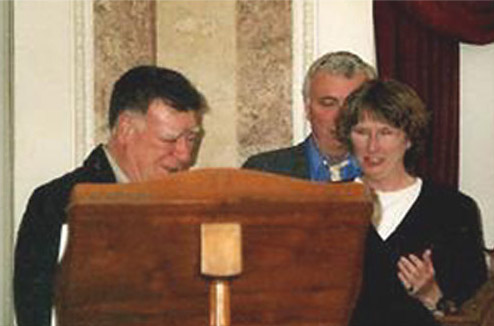
- D'Ambrosio (left) being presented with the Kenneth O. May medal in 2001.
- Born: December 8, 1932; São Paulo
- Died: May 12, 2021 (aged 88)
- Education: University of São Paulo
- Known for: Ethnomathematics, Ethnomathematics Program
- Awards: Kenneth O. May Prize (2001), Felix Klein Medal (2005)

Ubiratan D'Ambrosio (December 8, 1932 – May 12, 2021) was a Brazilian mathematics educator and historian of mathematics known for being the originator of the term Ethnomathematics, and for his efforts to promote mathematics education in Brazil.

== Life ==
D'Ambrosio was born in São Paulo, and earned his doctorate from the University of São Paulo in 1963. In 1964, he took a post-doctoral position at Brown University, intending to stay for one year, but was forced to stay in the United States due to the military coup in Brazil. He later worked at SUNY Buffalo, where he studied calculus of variations and measure theory, before returning to Brazil in 1972 where he took a position directing the department of mathematics, statistics and scientific computing at the State University of Campinas in São Paulo. He also served as a visiting professor at the graduate program at the Center Pédagogique Supérieur in Bamako, Mali. During this time he was elected president of the Inter-American Committee on Mathematics Education. He retired as a professor of mathematics from the State University of Campinas, São Paulo, Brazil in 1993, but continued researching at the Pontifical Catholic University of São Paulo.

He was a member of many societies, including Pugwash, and served the International Commission on the History of Mathematics (ICHM) for five years.

D'Ambrosio was also the founder of the Brazilian Society for Mathematics and History of the International Group of Ethnomathematicians.

In 2001, he and Lam Lay Yong were jointly awarded the Kenneth O. May Prize.

== Ethnomathematics ==
D'Ambriosio is most well known for popularizing the field of study of Ethnomathematics. While Ethnomathematics has been defined many ways by different people, D'Ambrosio defined it as a study of mathematics related to members of distinct cultural groups groups,including indigenous people, workers and even children. He first coined the term in 1977 during a presentation at The Annual Meeting of the American Association for the Advancement of Science in Denver, Colorado. Some of D'Ambrosio's early studies of ethnomathematics included research on the mathematics done by residents of favelas in Campinas, in the Brazilian state of São Paolo. These studies were led by students of Paulo Freire, who incorporated Freire's educational ideas. These projects eventually developed into a master's program in mathematics education, which incorporated both community engagement in teaching and formal study of the mathematics involved. He wrote about many different forms of ethnomathematics, including a discussion of Australopithecus' spatial reasoning, although he primarily focused on methods of mathematics education. He continued presenting and writing about the subject in subsequent years, and his work included both mathematical history, research in mathematics education and ethnomathematical studies. He eventually becoming a founding member of the International Study Group on Ethnomathematics in 1985, and served as its president from 1996 until 2000. The group published biannual newsletters between 1985 and 1998, before resuming in 2020.

== Writings ==
=== Books ===
- 1996, Educação Matemática: da teoria à prática. ISBN 9788530804107

=== Book chapters ===
- 1997, Ethno Mathematics. Challenging Eurocentrism, in Arthur B. Powell, Marilyn Frankenstein (eds.) Mathematics Education, State University of New York Press, Albany 1997, p. 13–24.
- Historiographical Proposal for Non-Western Mathematics, in Helaine Selin (ed.), Mathematics Across Cultures. The History of Non-Western Mathematics, Kluwer Academic Publishers, Dordrecht, 2000, pp. 79–92.

=== Articles ===
- A Busca da paz como responsabilidade dos matemáticos. Cuadernos de Investigación y Formación en Educación Matemática 7 (2011)
- A Etnomatemática no processo de construção de uma escola indígena. Em aberto 63 (1994)
