= Jens Høyrup =

Danish mathematician and historian of mathematics (born 1943)

Jens Egede Høyrup
- Born: 1943 (age 82–83); Copenhagen
- Awards: Kenneth O. May Medal and Prize
- Scientific career
- Fields: history of mathematics
- Workplaces: Roskilde University

Jens Egede Høyrup (born 1943) is a Danish historian of mathematics, specializing in pre-modern and early modern mathematics, particularly ancient Mesopotamian mathematics. He is known for his interpretation of what has often been referred to as Old Babylonian "algebra" as consisting of concrete, geometric manipulations.

== Career ==
Born in Copenhagen in 1943, Høyrup studied physics and mathematics at the Niels Bohr Institute of the University of Copenhagen from 1962 to 1965, and at the Institut Henri Poincaré in Paris from 1965 to 1966, with a focus on physics. In 1969, he obtained his masters degree with a thesis on particle physics.

From 1971 to 1973, he was assistant lecturer in physics at the Danish Academy for Engineering. Starting in 1973, he was senior lecturer and in 1989 reader for the history and philosophy of science at Roskilde University, most recently in the Section for Philosophy and Science Studies. In 1995, he habilitated. Since 2005 he is professor emeritus. In 2008/09 he held the Sarton Chair in History of Science at the Ghent University. He is currently Honorary Research Fellow at the Institute for the History of Natural Sciences of the Chinese Academy of Sciences and a visiting scholar at the Max Planck Institute for the History of Science in Berlin. In 2013, he was awarded the Kenneth O. May Medal and Prize of the International Commission on the History of Mathematics (ICHM) for "outstanding contributions to the history of mathematics".

== Scholarship ==
Høyrup's research focuses on the history of mathematics, especially Babylonian mathematics. It also includes studies of Greek, Latin, Chinese, medieval Islamic and European, and modern mathematics. He has also written about mathematics and war. He has studied the early Italian abbacus tradition, arguing that its origins lie prior to Fibonacci's Liber Abacci and "that it is much less directly influenced by the scholarly level of Arabic mathematics than generally thought".

In the 1980s, Høyrup began a reanalysis of Old Babylonian "algebra", based on a close inspection of Babylonian arithmetical terminology. He pioneered the use of "conformal translation" in this context, thereby preserving the distinctions between different conceptions of what had been regarded as equivalent mathematical operations. He concluded, for example, the Babylonian mathematics includes two different additions and at least four different multiplications, and that these distinct operations corresponded to distinct cut-and-paste geometric operations with origins in the practical surveyor tradition. Using this foundation, it became possible to understand texts that had previously been regarded as consisting of algebraic manipulations of abstract quantities as series of concrete operations on geometric figures. For example, in Høyrup's reading, texts describing the process of completing the square are seen as instructions for cutting and pasting rectangular areas to form a square.

== Selected works ==
- Høyrup, Jens (1990). "Algebra and naive geometry: an investigation of some basic aspects of Old Babylonian mathematical thought I". Altorientalische Forschungen. 17 (1–2): 27–69. doi:10.1524/aofo.1990.17.12.27., Høyrup, Jens (1990). "Algebra and naive geometry: an investigation of some basic aspects of Old Babylonian mathematical thought II". Altorientalische Forschungen. 17 (1–2): 262–354. doi:10.1524/aofo.1990.17.12.262.
- Lengths, Widths and Surfaces. A portrait of old Babylonian algebra and its kin. Sources and Studies in the History of Mathematics and Physical Sciences. Springer. 2002. doi:10.1007/978-1-4757-3685-4. ISBN 978-1-4419-2945-7.
- Høyrup, Jens (2017). Algebra in Cuneiform: Introduction to an Old Babylonian Geometrical Technique. Edition Open Access. ISBN 978-3-945561-15-7.
- editor with Bernhelm Booss-Bavnbek: Mathematics and War, Birkhäuser 2003, doi:10.1007/978-3-0348-8093-0,
- Booss-Bavnbek, Bernhelm; Høyrup, Jens (2003). "Mathematicians and war: an invitation to revisit". Mathematical Intelligencer. 25 (3): 12–25. doi:10.1007/BF02984843.
- editor with Peter Damerow: Changing views on ancient Near Eastern mathematics, Berliner Beiträge zum Vorderen Orient Bd. 19, Dietrich Reimer 2001 (aus entsprechendem Seminar an der FU Berlin seit 1983)
- Jacopo da Firenze's Tractatus algorismi and early italian abacus culture. Science Network. Historical Studies. Vol. 34. Birkhäuser. 2007. doi:10.1007/978-3-7643-8391-6. ISBN 978-3-7643-8390-9.
