= Tinne (given name) =

Tinne is a Germanic female given name.

Notable people with this name include:

- Tinne Gilis, Belgian squash player
- Tinne Hoff Kjeldsen, Danish mathematician
- Tinne Kruse, Danish badminton player
- Tinne Van der Straeten, Flemish politician
- Tinne Vilhelmson-Silfvén, Swedish horse rider
