= Joseph Ehrenfried Hofmann =

German historian of mathematics (1900–1973)

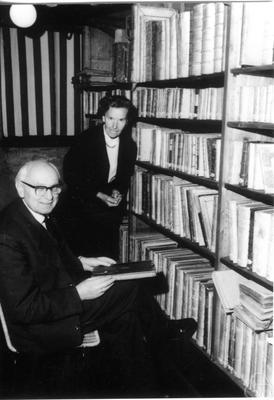
Hofmann (left) in Oberwolfach

Joseph Ehrenfried Hofmann (* 7 March 1900 in Munich, † 7 May 1973 in Günzburg ) was a German historian of mathematics, known for his research on Gottfried Wilhelm Leibniz.

== Life and work ==
After graduating from high school in 1919 at the Wilhelm Gymnasium in Munich, Hofmann studied at the Ludwig-Maximilians-Universität München (LMU) with Walther von Dyck and George Faber, gaining a Ph.D. in 1927. He was briefly an assistant in Munich and Darmstadt, before he went into the teaching profession in Günzburg, Nördlingen.

As a student he was drawn to the history of mathematics after observing his mentor Faber publishing works of Euler. Another influence was Henry Wieleitner, with whom he published several works on the history of calculus. As a school teacher, he continued his historical studies. In 1939, he habilitated in the history of mathematics at the Humboldt University of Berlin.

From 1940 to 1945, he edited an edition of the works of Leibniz for the Berlin Academy of Sciences. Hofmann returned to secondary education in Günzburg from 1947 until his retirement in 1963. He also had (in part-time) professor of the History of Mathematics at the University of Freiburg, the Humboldt University of Berlin, the University of Tübingen (honorary professorship in 1950) and the Technical University of Karlsruhe.

Hofmann organized regular symposia on the history of mathematics at the Mathematical Research Institute of Oberwolfach, where he worked right after the war. Hofmann was considered an expert in the development of calculus by Leibniz, whose time in Paris he studied carefully. He recorded how the Newton-Leibniz calculus controversy contributed to the invention of calculus.

He was co-editor of the works of Leibniz, of Nicholas of Cusa, and of Johann Bernoulli as well as a mathematical history of Abraham Gotthelf Kästner. He also wrote about number theory of Leonhard Euler and Pierre de Fermat. He uncovered some new works of Fermat (published 1943).

Out for a morning walk, he was killed by a vehicular hit and run.

== Writings ==
- Selected Writings, 2 vols, (Editor Christoph Scriba ), Olms, Hildesheim 1990

with Oskar Becker : History of Mathematics, Bonn, Atheneum Publishing, 1951 (derived from Hofmann Part 2 and 3)

- History of Mathematics, 3 volumes, de Gruyter, collection Goschen 1953-1957 (Part 1: From the beginnings to the emergence of Fermat and Descartes, 1953, Part 2: From Fermat and Descartes to the invention of calculus and to the development of new Methods, 2nd edition 1963, Part 3: From the debate over the calculus until the French Revolution, 1957, with detailed bibliography). His history of mathematics has also been translated into Spanish, French and English ( Classical Mathematics, New York, Philosophical Library, 1960, The History of Mathematics, New York, Philosophical Library 1957)
- Leibniz in Paris 1672-1676 - his growth to mathematical maturity, Cambridge University Press, 1974
- The evolution of Leibniz's Mathematics, Munich, and Leibniz-Verlag, 1949, English edition of Leibniz in Paris 1672-1676: His growth to mathematical maturity, 1974
- Nicholas Mercator, his life and work, preferably as a mathematician, Academy of Sciences in Mainz, Abh Math-Natural Sciences. Class 3, Volume, p 43–103, 1950
- Frans von Schooten the Younger, Steiner Verlag, Wiesbaden, Boethius, Volume 2, 1962
- On Jacob Bernoulli's contributions to infinitesimal mathematics, L'Enseignement Mathématique, Series 2, Volume 2, 1956
- Michael Stifel. Life, work and relevance to the mathematics of his time, Sudhoffs Archives, Supplement 9, Steiner Verlag 1968
- Four decades in the struggle for mathematics and historical contexts, in Bernhard Sticker, Friedrich Klemm (ed.) ways of the History of Science, Wiesbaden 1969

== Additional sources ==
- Folkerts . Joseph Ehrenfried Hofmann †. Sudhoffs archive. Journal of the History of Science, Volume 57, Issue 3, 1973, p. 227-230 (with portrait).
- Christoph Scriba (1975) "Chronology of J.E. Hofmann, bibliographic note and summary bibliography of his writings", Historia Mathematica 2(2): 147–152 doi:10.1016/0315-0860(75)90139-1
- List of his writings: Joseph Ehrenfried Hofmann's 70th Birthday, casting notices from the mathematical seminar, Issue 90, 1971, ISSN 0373-8221, pp. 51–73.
- Siegfried Gottwald, Hans-Joachim Illgauds, Karl-Heinz Schlote (ed.): Encyclopedia of important mathematicians. Bibliographical Institute, Leipzig, 1990, ISBN 3-323-00319-5 .
- Joseph W. Dauben, Christoph J. Scriba (Eds.): Writing the history of mathematics. Its historical development . Birkhauser, Basel and others 2002, ISBN 3-7643-6167-0, ( Science Networks 27).
