= Theaetetus (poet) =

Was a poet of the Greek Anthology

Theaetetus (Greek: Θεαίτητος, Theaítētos; fl. 3rd century BC) was a poet of the Greek Anthology.

Of Theaetetus the poet, we only know with certainty that he lived at or after the time of the Academic philosopher Crantor, his epitaph upon whom is preserved by Diogenes Laertius. Crantor flourished about Olympiad 116, 316 BC. Six epigrams of Theaetetus are contained in the Greek Anthology; another is by the later Theaetetus Scholasticus.

== Bibliography ==
- Folkerts, Menso; Albiani, Maria Grazia (2006). "Theaetetus (2)". In Salazar, Christine F. (ed.). Brill's New Pauly. Accessed 14 February 2022.
- Smith, Philip (1867). "Theaetetus (3)". In Smith, William (ed.) Dictionary of Greek and Roman Biography and Mythology. 3. Boston: Little, Brown & Co. p. 1021.
