= Hélène Bellosta =

French historian of mathematics (1946–2011)

Hélène Bellosta-Baylet (1946 – 19 August 2011) was a French historian of mathematics specializing in mathematics in medieval Islam.

== Education and career ==
Bellosta was a student at the École normale supérieure de jeunes filles, and taught mathematics in the lycées for many years. She became a student of the historian of mathematics Roshdi Rashed, earned a doctorate in epistemology and the history of science at Paris Diderot University, and, after four years of work at the French Institute of Arab Studies in Damascus (IFEAD), became a director of research for the French National Centre for Scientific Research (CNRS), associated with the Center for the History of Arab and Medieval Sciences and Philosophies at Paris Diderot University.

== Books ==
With Rashed, Bellosta edited and translated the works of Apollonius of Perga in the book Apollonius de Perge, La section des droites selon des rapports, Commentaire historique et mathématique, édition et traduction du texte arabe (de Gruyter, 2010). They were also the coauthors of a book on Ibrahim ibn Sinan, Ibrāhīm ibn Sinān: Logique et géométrie au X^{e} siècle (Brill, 2000).

== Recognition ==
Bellosta became a corresponding member of the International Academy of the History of Science in 2005.
