= Theaetetus Scholasticus =

Byzantine epigrammatist

Theaetetus Scholasticus (Greek: Θεαίτητος Σχολαστικός, romanized: Theaítētos Scholastikos; fl. 6th century AD) was a Byzantine Greek epigrammatist.

Theaetetus was of the time of Justinian, as is clearly proved by the references in his epigrams to Domninus, who was prefect of the city under Justin I, and to Julianus Antecessor. Reiske confounded him with an earlier epigrammatist of the same name. The Medicean Library contains a manuscript tract περὶ ἀττικῶν ὀνομάτων under the name of Theaetetus Scholasticus; and the Suda mentions a work on Proverbs (περὶ παροιμιῶν) by a certain Theaetetus.

== Bibliography ==
- Folkerts, Menso; Albiani, Maria Grazia (2006). "Theaetetus (3)". In Salazar, Christine F. (ed.). Brill's New Pauly. Accessed 14 February 2022.
- Smith, Philip (1867). "Theaetetus (4)". In Smith, William (ed.) Dictionary of Greek and Roman Biography and Mythology. 3. Boston: Little, Brown & Co. p. 1021.
