= Claude Debru =

French philosopher (born 1944)

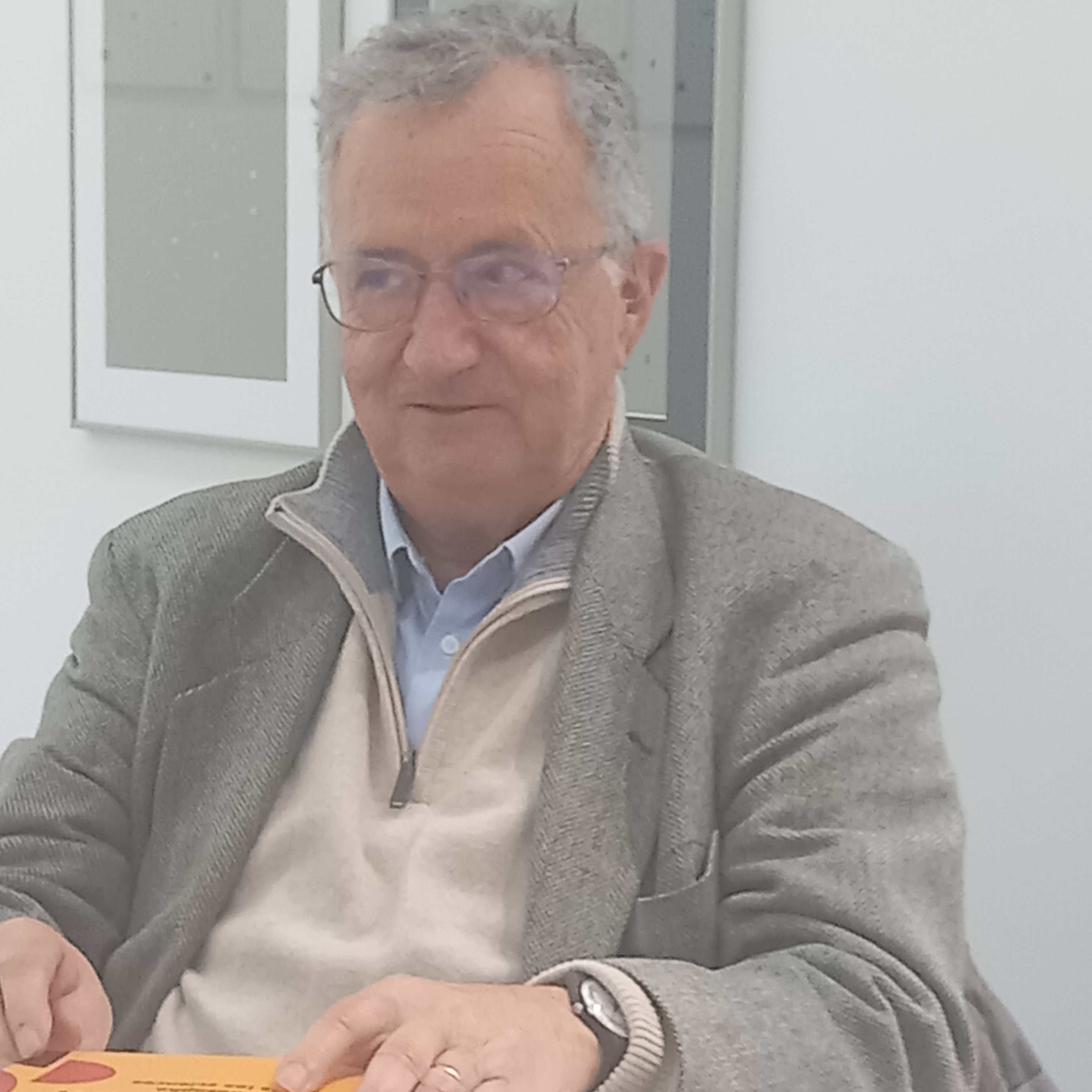
Image of Claude Debru

Claude Debru (born 3 December 1944) is a French philosophy teacher. He is a member of the French Academy of sciences.

== Biography ==
He has been Director of the Philosophy Department at École Normale Supérieur (ENS) Ulm since 2002 and is now director emeritus. He has been a member of the French Academy of sciences since 15 March 2011.

Disciple of Georges Canguilhem, agrégé de philosophie (1974), Docteur ès lettres (1982) and director of research at the CNRS, he was a student at the École normale supérieure de la rue d'Ulm.

In 1990, he published a book on philosophy of science on the dream entitled "Neurophilosophy of the Dream".

In 1994, he co-wrote with Tonia Cariffa a monograph on the painter Eska Kayser.

== Scientific work ==
With a dual background in philosophy and life sciences, Claude Debru has devoted his work to the history and epistemology of life sciences and medicine. Student of the philosopher Georges Canguilhem, trained in the conceptual history of philosophy and science through his postgraduate thesis on the theory of space, he turned to biochemistry and wrote his State thesis on the history of protein biochemistry, in contact with biophysical chemists Jeffries Wyman, John Edsall and René Wurmser. In this work, which considers both the long historical duration and the strictly philosophical problems raised by the new biochemistry, as well as the most recent developments, he analyzed the evolution of new theoretical models of allosteric protein function from the perspective of structure-function relationships. Two books have been devoted to this new "molecular philosophy". Then, wishing to approach the more strictly experimental aspects of life sciences, and in particular the new neurosciences, he joined, as an epistemologist, the Department of Experimental Medicine of the Faculty of Medicine of Lyon headed by Michel Jouvet, to study the development of research on REM sleep and dreams, mainly from the philosophical angle of "psychophysiological parallelism", which involved all disciplines of neuroscience, and from that of functional hypotheses, making REM sleep play a functional role in the individuation of the brain. This long-term stay resulted in the publication of a book.

In contact with hematologists Jean Bernard, Marcel Bessis and Jacques-Louis Binet, Claude Debru also learned about the problems of cell morphology and pathophysiology of leukaemias, and participated in several projects at the Centre d'écologie cellulaire de la Salpêtrière. From this body of experience in the biological and medical sciences, Claude Debru drew the substance from a new book of epistemology and history in order to analyse the process of research and discovery, analysing some of Claude Bernard's work in the light of artificial intelligence, questioning the resolution of the paradoxes that have given rise to neuroendocrinology, unclassifiable leukaemias or cell death. Extending his investigation to new biotechnologies, Claude Debru reflected on their relationship to the notion of possibility and their biological justification.

Returning to neuroscience, its history and its relationship to philosophy, Claude Debru has undertaken several studies on the development of neuroscience in France after the Second World War and on the temporal aspects of brain function, from William James to recent developments, establishing a long-term collaboration with Pierre Buser. This collaboration continued with Alain Berthoz on the theme of anticipation. Collaborations with the Deutsche Akademie der Naturforscher Leopoldina have resulted in several publications, on imagination and intuition in science, on the Enlightenment, on science and academia during the First World War.

== Main books ==
- 1977 - Analyse et Représentation. De la méthodologie à la théorie de l’espace : Kant et Lambert, Paris, Vrin.
- 1983 – L’esprit des protéines. Histoire et philosophie biochimiques, Paris, Hermann.
- 1987 – Philosophie moléculaire : Monod, Wyman, Changeux, Paris, Vrin.
- 1990 – Neurophilosophie du rêve, Paris, Hermann, 2^{e} édition, Paris, Hermann, 2006, Préface de Michel Jouvet, trad. espagnole Neurofilosofia del suegno, Madrid, CSIIC, 2008, trad. anglaise, Préfaces de Barbara Jones et de Lichel Jouvet, Paris, Hermann, 2017.
- 1990 – Soi et Non-Soi, sous la direction de Jean Bernard, Marcel Bessis et Claude Debru, Paris, Seuil.
- 1998 – Philosophie de l’Inconnu. Le Vivant et la Recherche, Paris, PUF. Nouvelle édition, Penser l’inconnu ? La recherche en biologie, Paris, Hermann, 2009.
- 2003 – Le possible et les biotechnologies. Essai de philosophie dans les sciences, avec la collaboration de Pascal Nouvel, Paris, PUF, traduction arabe, Organisation arabe pour la traduction, Beyrouth, 2007.
- 2006 – Facets of the History of Neuroscience (éds. Pierre Buser, Jean-Gael Barbara et Claude Debru), Comptes rendus de l’Académie des sciences (Biologies), vol. 329.
- 2008 – L’essor des neurosciences, France, 1945–1975 (éds. Claude Debru, Jean-Gaël Barbara et Céline Cherici), Paris, Hermann.
- 2008 – William James, Psychologie et cognition (éds. Claude Debru, Christiane Chaviré et Mathias Girel), Paris, Petra.
- 2011 – Le temps. Instant et durée, de la philosophie aux neurosciences (Pierre Buser et Claude Debru), Paris, Odile Jacob.
- 2012 – Le sens du futur. Une science du temps au XIXe siècle, Paris, Hermann.
- 2015 – Anticipation et prédiction. Du geste au voyage mental (Alain Berthoz et Claude Debru), Paris, Odile Jacob.
- 2009 – L’Imagination et l’Intuition dans les sciences (éds. Pierre Buser, Claude Debru et Andreas Kleinert), Paris, Hermann.
- 2013 – Les Lumières : hier, aujourd’hui, demain. Sciences et société (éds; Pierre Buser, Claude Debru, Philippe Meyer), Paris, Hermann.

== Honours and awards ==
- Member of the Deutsche Akademie der Naturforscher Leopoldina
- Corresponding member of the International Academy of the History of Science
- Binoux Prize of the French Academy of sciences (1983)
- Grammaticakis Neuman Prize from the French Academy of sciences (1992)
- Blaise Pascal Medal of the European Academy of Sciences (2009)
- Gustav Neuenschwander Prize of the European Society for the History of Science (2012)
- Member of the Society for the History and Epistemology of Life Sciences
- Member of the French Society for the History of Science and Technology
- Member of the Académie d'Agriculture de France (2015)
- Officier in the Ordre national du Mérite
- Chevalier of the Palmes Académqiues
- Chevalier of the Légion d'Honneur
- Cross of the Order of Merit of the Federal Republic of Germany
