= Arnold Kohlschütter =

German astronomer and astrophysicist

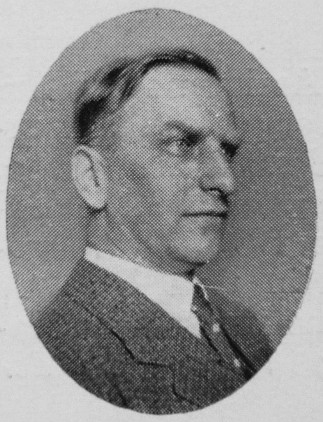
Arnold Kohlschütter

Ernst Arnold Kohlschütter (6 July 1883 – 28 May 1969) was a German astronomer and astrophysicist from Halle.

In 1908 he was awarded his Ph.D. from the University of Göttingen under Karl Schwarzschild.

In 1911 he began working at the Mount Wilson Observatory, studying the spectra of the Sun and stars in collaboration with Walter Sidney Adams. In 1914 they discovered that the absolute luminosity of a star is proportional to the relative intensity of the lines in the spectrum. This allowed astronomers to determine the distance of stars, including main sequence and giants, using the spectroscope.

He became the director of the Bonn observatory in 1925. Therein he was dedicated to astrometric studies, such as the Bonn portion of AGK2.

The crater Kohlschütter on the Moon is named after him.

== See also ==
- Ackermann–Teubner Memorial Award
- Spectroscopic parallax
