= Tinne Hoff Kjeldsen =

Danish mathematician

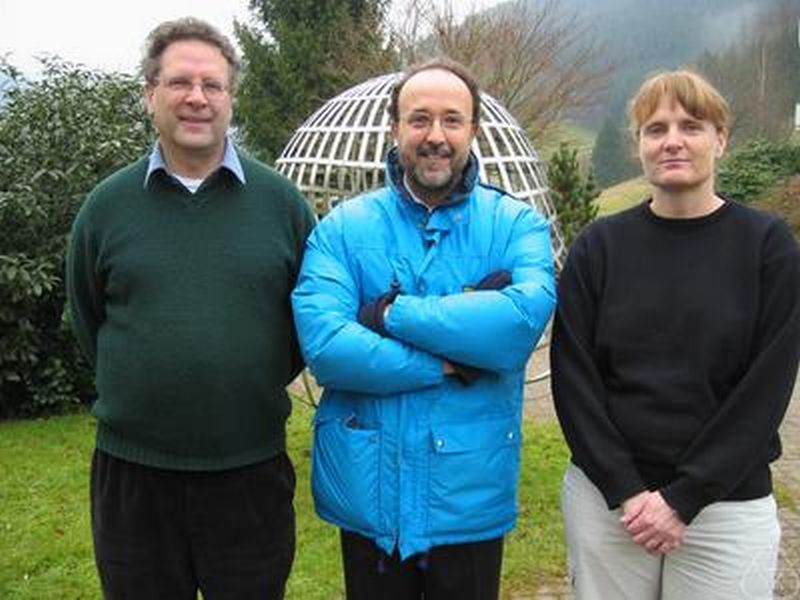
- From left: David E. Rowe, Niccolò Guicciardini, Tinne Hoff Kjeldsen, Oberwolfach 2005
- Education: Roskilde University
- Scientific career
- Fields: Mathematics
- Thesis: A contextualized mathematical history analysis of nonlinear programming: development history and multiple discovery (1999)
- Doctoral advisor: Anders Hede Madsen

Tinne Hoff Kjeldsen (Danish pronunciation: [ˈkʰelˀsn̩]) is a Danish mathematician who works in the Department of Science, Systems and Models (IMFUFA) at Roskilde University, and in the Department of Science Education at the University of Copenhagen. Her research interests include the philosophy of mathematics, history of mathematics, and mathematics education.

== Life and work ==
Kjeldsen earned her doctorate in 1999 from Roskilde University under the supervision of Anders Hede Madsen. It was titled: En kontekstualiseret matematikhistorisk analyse af ikke-lineær programmering: udviklingshistorie og multipel opdagelse (A contextualized mathematical history analysis of nonlinear programming: development history and multiple discovery.

In 2012, she became one of the fellows of the American Mathematical Society.
