= Walter Purkert =

German mathematician and math historian

Walter Purkert (born 22 January 1944 in Trautenau) is a German mathematician and historian of mathematics.

== Career ==
Purkert received his doctorate (Promotion) in 1972 from Leipzig University. His thesis Die Entwicklung des abstrakten Körperbegriffs (The development of the abstract concept of the algebraic structure called a field) was supervised by Hans Wußing. From 1972 to 1979 Purkert was employed in the mathematics section of Leipzig University's mathematics/natural sciences department. In the mathematics section of Leipzig University's department of the history of medicine and the natural sciences, he was from 1979 to 1987 a lecturer (Dozent), from 1987 to 1991 a professor extraordinarius, and from 1988 to 1990 the director of the mathematics section.

Purkert was a visiting professor in the summer of 1988 at Pace University and for the academic year 1992–1993 at the University of Wuppertal. He has been a research assistant and professor at the University of Bonn since the mid-1990s. There he was coordinating editor of the Hausdorff Edition. This annotated edition of the collected works of Felix Hausdorff includes the philosophical and literary writings published under Hausdorff's pseudonym Paul Mongré. The leading editorial committee had five members including, besides Purkert, Egbert Brieskorn (the project initiator), Friedrich Hirzebruch, Reinhold Remmert, and Erhard Scholz. There is a first edition done by editors from Germany and four other countries. There is also a supplemented edition. More than twenty mathematicians, historians, philosophers and literary scholars worked together. The edition was carried out as a long-term project by the Nordrhein-Westfälische Akademie der Wissenschaften und der Künste (North Rhine-Westphalia Academy for Sciences and Arts). The edition comprises 10 separate volumes (IA, IB, and II through IX). The volumes were published between 2001 and 2020 by Springer Verlag. Purkert completed (during 2013–2018) the biography of Hausdorff (Volume IB of the edition) begun by Egbert Brieskorn (1936–2013) and also edited Hausdorff's correspondence (Volume IX of the edition).

Purkert was the co-author, with Hans-Joachim Ilgauds, of a well-regarded biography of Georg Cantor. Purkert also edited Felix Klein's 1891–1892 lectures in Göttingen on Riemann surfaces. In addition to his historical and editorial research, Purkert published mathematical research on stochastic analysis.

== Honors ==
In 2005 Purkert gave the historical lecture Felix Hausdorff - Mathematiker, Philosoph und Literat, which was part of the events accompanying the Euler Lecture. He was elected in 2007 a corresponding member of the Académie Internationale d’Histoire des Sciences, Paris and in 2015 a member of the Bernoulli-Euler-Gesellschaft, Basel.

== Selected publications ==
- Die Hilbertschen Probleme. Erl. von e. Autorenkollektiv unter d. Red. von P.S. Alexandrov. Vortrag "Mathematische Probleme" von D. Hilbert, gehalten auf d. 2. Internat. Mathematikerkongress Paris 1900 (translated into German from the Russian original and edited by Hannelore Bernhardt and Walter Burkert), Akademische Verlagsgesellschaft Geest und Portig, Leipzig 1971, 2nd edition 1979, 3rd edition 1983. (See Hilbert's problems.)
- with Jürgen vom Scheidt: Schwach korrelierte Prozesse und ihre Anwendungen (Weakly correlated processes and their applications). Akademie-Verlag, Berlin 1980. LCCN 81-181436
- with Jürgen vom Scheidt: Random Eigenvalue Problems. North Holland 1983. LCCN 82-18225 ISBN 0-444-00769-5
- with Hans-Joachim Ilgauds: Georg Cantor. Teubner, 1985, LCCN 85-215104; Birkhäuser, 1987 (Vita Mathematica)
  - Purkert, Walter; Ilgauds, Hans J. (8 March 2013). 2013 pbk edition. Springer. ISBN 978-3-0348-7411-3.
- Klein, Felix (1986). Riemannsche Flächen : Vorlesungen, gehalten in Göttingen 1891/92. Leipzig: B.G. Teubner. LCCN 87100855; edited & annotated by G. Eisenreich und W. Purkert
- Brückenkurs Mathematik für Wirtschaftswissenschaftler (Preparatory mathematical course for economists). Teubner, 1995, 9th edition 2022 (Springer/Gabler, Wiesbaden, ISBN 978-3-658-36741-1).
- with Erhard Scholz: Purkert, Walter; Scholz, Erhard (2009). "Zur Lage der Mathematikgeschichte in Deutschland". Mitteilungen der Deutschen Mathematiker-Vereinigung. 17 (4): 215–217. doi:10.1515/dmvm-2009-0092; (On the situation of the history of mathematics in Germany)
- with Egbert Brieskorn: Felix Hausdorff-Biographie. volume IB (in German) of Hausdorff-Edition, Springer 2018. ISBN 3662563800
- Felix Hausdorff: Mathematiker, Philosoph und Literat (Mathematik im Kontext), Springer 2021.
  - Felix Hausdorff: Mathematician, Philosopher, Man of Letters. Springer 2024. ISBN 978-3-031-52134-8
