= Ackermann–Teubner Memorial Award =

Award for mathematical analysis work

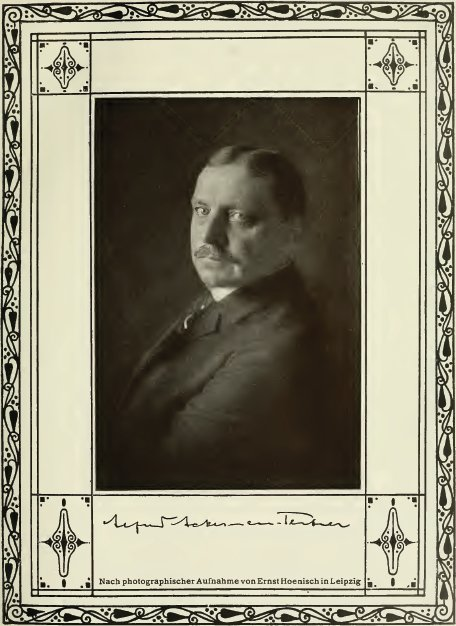
Portrait of Alfred Ackermann-Teubner

The Alfred Ackermann–Teubner Memorial Award for the Promotion of Mathematical Sciences recognized work in mathematical analysis. It was established in 1912 by engineer Alfred Ackermann-Teubner and was an endowment of the University of Leipzig.

It was awarded 14 times between 1914 and 1941. Subsequent awards were to be made every other year until a surplus of 60,000 marks was accumulated within the endowment, at which time, the prize was to be awarded annually. The subjects included:

- History, philosophy, teaching
- Mathematics, especially arithmetic and algebra
- Mechanics
- Mathematical physics
- Mathematics, especially analysis
- Astronomy and theory of errors
- Mathematics, especially geometry
- Applied mathematics, especially geodesy and geophysics.

== Honorees ==
The fifteen honorees between 1914 and 1941 are:

- 1914: Felix Klein
- 1916: Ernst Zermelo, prize of 1,000 marks
- 1918: Ludwig Prandtl
- 1920: Gustav Mie
- 1922: Paul Koebe
- 1924: Arnold Kohlschütter
- 1926: Wilhelm Blaschke
- 1928: Albert Defant
- 1930: Johannes Tropfke
- 1932: Emmy Noether and Emil Artin, co-honorees
- 1934: Erich Trefftz^{(de)}
- 1937: Pascual Jordan
- 1938: Erich Hecke
- 1941: Paul ten Bruggencate

== Jurists ==
In 1937, Constantin Carathéodory and Erhard Schmidt were invited to jury the award. Along with Wilhelm Blaschke, Carathéodory was invited again in 1944 by the German Union of Mathematicians.

== See also ==
- List of mathematics awards
