= Dirk Jan Struik =

Dutch-born American mathematician (1894–2000)

- Dirk Jan Struik
- Born: September 30, 1894; Rotterdam, Netherlands
- Died: October 21, 2000 (aged 106); Belmont, Massachusetts, U.S.
- Education: University of Leiden
- Known for: A Concise History of Mathematics; A Source Book in Mathematics, 1200–1800
- Spouse: Saly Ruth Ramler (m. 1923)
- Children: 3; Dr. Ruth Rebekka Struik; Anne Macchi; Gwendolyn Bray
- Awards: Kenneth O. May Prize (1989)
- Scientific career
- Fields: Multidimensional geometry, history of mathematics
- Workplaces: Massachusetts Institute of Technology, Delft University of Technology
- Doctoral advisor: W. van der Woude; Jan Schouten
- Doctoral students: Joseph Dauben; Judith Grabiner; Eric Reissner; Domina Eberle Spencer

Dirk Jan Struik (September 30, 1894 – October 21, 2000) was a Dutch-born American (since 1934) mathematician, historian of mathematics, and Marxist theoretician who spent most of his life in the U.S.

== Biography ==
=== Early life ===
Dirk Jan Struik was born in 1894 in Rotterdam, Netherlands. His father Hendrik Jan Struik was a grammar school teacher with a passion for mathematics and history. Nearly a century later when Dirk received a Kenneth O. May Medal, he began his acceptance speech with a tribute to Hendrik for cultivating his son's appetite for knowledge. From 1906 to 1911, Dirk attended the Hogere Burgers School in Rotterdam, where he was introduced to left-wing politics and socialism by a favorite math teacher, G. W. Ten Dam.

After entering the University of Leiden in 1912, Struik showed a strong aptitude for mathematics and physics. He was taught by the eminent professors Willem de Sitter, Hendrik Lorentz and Paul Ehrenfest. The unconventional Ehrenfest was said to have exerted the greatest influence on Struik's thinking.

In 1917, to help cover university expenses, Struik worked for a while as a high school math teacher. He was next hired as a research assistant to J. A. Schouten, a distinguished mathematics professor at the Technical University in Delft. During this period, Struik developed his doctoral dissertation, "The Application of Tensor Methods to Riemannian Manifolds."

In 1922, Struik obtained a doctorate in mathematics from University of Leiden. He was appointed to a teaching position at University of Utrecht in 1923. That same year he married Saly Ruth Ramler, a Czech mathematician with a doctorate from the Charles University of Prague. They remained married until her death in 1993.

=== Career ===
In 1924, funded by a Rockefeller fellowship, Struik traveled to Rome to collaborate with the Italian mathematician Tullio Levi-Civita. It was in Rome that Struik started pursuing his interest in the history of mathematics. In 1925, thanks to an extension of his fellowship, he worked with Richard Courant at the University of Göttingen, where Struik got the opportunity to edit Felix Klein's unpublished lectures on 19th century mathematics. While there, Struik made extensive use of the university library to research Renaissance mathematicians. He also rekindled interest in a mistaken claim Aristotle had made that space could be tiled with regular congruent tetrahedra. Aristotle's error was first challenged in 1435.

In 1926, Struik was offered positions as a lecturer in mathematics at Moscow State University and at the Massachusetts Institute of Technology (MIT). He decided to accept the latter offer, and spent the rest of his academic career there. He was promoted to assistant professor in 1928, associate professor in 1931, and was made a full professor in 1940. While at MIT, he collaborated with Norbert Wiener on differential geometry.

In 1936, Struik co-founded Science & Society. It would become the world's longest continuously running journal of Marxist scholarship. He regularly contributed articles to Science & Society, primarily on the history of science.

=== Political controversy ===
Struik was a steadfast believer in Marxism. Having joined the Communist Party of the Netherlands in 1919, he remained a Party member his entire life. When asked in 1994, upon the occasion of his 100th birthday, how he managed to still author peer-reviewed journal articles at such an advanced age, Struik replied blithely that he had the "3Ms" a man needs to sustain himself: Marriage (although he was recently a widower at that time), Mathematics, and Marxism.

During the early 1950s McCarthy era, Struik's Marxist opinions led to accusations of him being a spy for the Soviet Union. He was also cited as a "subversive influence in the educational process" in a U.S. Senate committee publication. He denied the allegations, and was called before the House Un-American Activities Committee (HUAC) on July 24, 1951. Struik refused to answer the more than 200 questions asked of him, repeatedly invoking the Fifth Amendment's shield against self-incrimination. (He had planned to invoke the First Amendment, but a recent U.S. Supreme Court case struck down that option.) On September 12, 1951, Struik was indicted by a Middlesex County grand jury for "conspiracy to overthrow the governments of the United States and Massachusetts, and for advocating the overthrow by violence of the government of the Commonwealth of Massachusetts". He was released on $10,000 bail. Soon thereafter, the MIT faculty voted to suspend him, with full salary, until the case was resolved.

In April 1953, the head of the MIT mathematics department, William Ted Martin, testified to the HUAC that he and Struik had both been members of an MIT communist cell between 1938 and 1946.

The indictment against Struik was quashed in 1956 by Judge Paul G. Kirk after the Massachusetts Supreme Court ruled in a different case that the federal Smith Act superseded state sedition laws. MIT lifted Struik's suspension on May 26, 1956, and he was reinstated as a faculty member. He retired from MIT in 1960.

=== Publications ===
Struik's most celebrated work was A Concise History of Mathematics. Originally published in 1948, it went through four revised editions and was translated into eighteen languages. Among his other works that became standard references or textbooks were Yankee Science in the Making and A Source Book in Mathematics, 1200–1800.

In 1950, Struik published his Lectures on Classical Differential Geometry, which garnered praise from Ian R. Porteous:

Of all the textbooks on elementary differential geometry published in the last fifty years the most readable is one of the earliest, namely that by D.J. Struik (1950). He is the only one to mention Allvar Gullstrand.

In 1971, Struik edited The Birth of the Communist Manifesto. He began the book with a lengthy essay, "Birth of the Communist Manifesto and its Historical Significance", that explicates the intellectual and social milieu from which the 1848 Manifesto emerged. In addition to supplying the full text of the document, with his annotations, Struik included as Appendices all Prefaces by Karl Marx and Friedrich Engels for the various language editions of the Manifesto, plus two early Manifesto drafts by Engels, one of which had just been found at the time Struik's book was published.

=== Final years, death, and legacy ===
In 1972, Struik was made an honorary research associate in the History of Science Department at Harvard University. In 1975, he won a Gold Medal of Achievement from the National University of Mexico "for his services to the teaching and development of mathematics in Mexico over the years." In 1989, he and Adolph P. Yushkevich were the inaugural winners of the Kenneth O. May Prize in the History of Mathematics.

On October 21, 2000, three weeks after celebrating his 106th birthday, Dirk Struik died at his home in Belmont, Massachusetts. A memorial service was held at MIT in the Sala de Puerto Rico room of the student union on campus — a location chosen to symbolize Struik's political sympathies with nations of the colonial and developing world. The gathering was attended by several hundred people with dozens of frequently politically-charged eulogies delivered by political comrades and personal associates.

Struik was memorialized with a short chapter in the book Moscow Stories by his colleague at MIT, Loren R. Graham, who said that Struik had, when asked, attributed his longevity to "the three Ms — mathematics, marriage, and Marxism."

Graham recalled Stuik having been asked by a reporter after the fall of the Soviet Union whether its collapse and subsequent revelations about the nature of Communism had caused him to reconsider his political beliefs. Struik replied, "No, of course not, because Marxism is an outlook on life. It's the same with Christians; you can be a good Christian despite the fact that Christians have committed horrible crimes in the name of Christianity."

== Books ==
- 1928: Het Probleem 'De impletione loci' (Dutch), Nieuw Archief voor Wiskunde, Series 2, 15 (1925–1928), no. 3, 121–137.
- 1950: Lectures on Classical Differential Geometry, Addison-Wesley.
- 1953: Lectures on Analytic and Projective Geometry, Addison-Wesley.
- 1957: The Origins of American Science (New England) via Internet Archive.
- 1971: (editor) Birth of the Communist Manifesto, New World Paperbacks ISBN 0-717-80288-4.
- 1986: (editor) A Source Book in Mathematics, 1200–1800, Princeton University Press ISBN 0-691-08404-1, ISBN 0-691-02397-2 (pbk).
- 1987: A Concise History of Mathematics, fourth revised edition, Dover Publications ISBN 0-486-60255-9, ISBN 978-0486602554.
- 1991: Yankee Science in the Making: Science and Engineering in New England from Colonial Times to the Civil War, second revised edition, Dover Publications ISBN 0-486-26927-2, ISBN 978-0486269276
