= Arabic Sciences and Philosophy =

- Discipline: Philosophy
- Language: English, French
- Edited by: Roshdi Rashed, Ahmed Hasnaoui

Publication details
- History: 1991–present
- Publisher: Cambridge University Press
- Frequency: Biannual

Standard abbreviations
- ISO 4: Arab. Sci. Philos.
- MathSciNet: Arabic Sci. Philos.

Indexing
- ISSN: 0957-4239 (print); 1474-0524 (web)
- OCLC no.: 50515196

Links
- Journal homepage; Online access; Online archive

Arabic Sciences and Philosophy, subtitled A Historical Journal, is a peer-reviewed academic journal published by Cambridge University Press. The journal deals with the history of Arabic science, mathematics and philosophy between the 8th and the 18th centuries in a cross-cultural context. It publishes original papers on the history of these disciplines as well as studies of the relations between Arabic sciences and philosophy, with Greek, Indian, Chinese, Latin, Byzantine, Syriac, and Hebrew sciences and philosophy. The journal was established in 1991 and is published twice a year.

== Abstracting and indexing ==
The journal is abstracted and indexed by International Bibliography of Periodical Literature, International Bibliography of Book Reviews of Scholarly Literature, and Scopus.
