= Susudata =

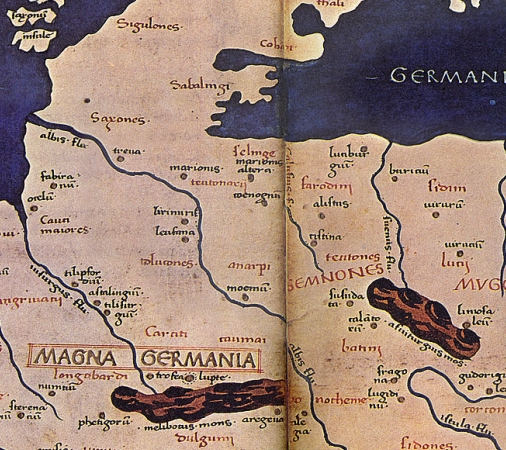
Germania magna in the world view of the Romans of the 2nd century AD according to Ptolemy in a 15th century map

Susudata was a placename pointed out in Ptolemy's atlas Geographia which is dated 150 AD. The word itself is a derivation from the Germanic term "Susutin". For a long time the place could not be positively identified, due to Ptolemy's variances. It was assumed to be in the vicinity of Berlin and could recently be located by an expedition led by Andreas Kleineberg, which confirmed the site at Fürstenwalde, Germany.

== Literature ==
- Andreas Kleineberg, Christian Marx, Eberhard Knobloch, Dieter Lelgemann: Germania und die Insel Thule.Die Entschlüsselung von Ptolemaios' "Atlas der Oikumene".Wissenschaftl. Buchgesell.,2010.
- Claudius Ptolemäus: Geographia, Ed. C. F. A. Nobbe cum introd. Aubrey Diller, Hildesheim 1966.
- Achim Leube: Die römische Kaiserzeit im Oder-Spree-Gebiet, Berlin(Ost) 1975.
