= Niccolò Guicciardini =

Italian historian of mathematics

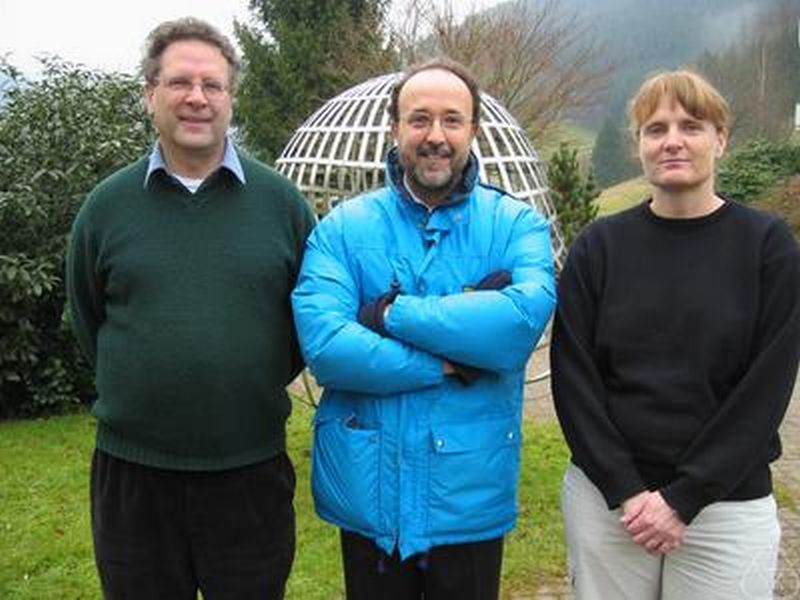
From left: David E. Rowe, Niccolò Guicciardini, Tinne Hoff Kjeldsen, Oberwolfach 2005

Niccolò Guicciardini Corsi Salviati (born 28 May 1957 in Florence) is an Italian historian of mathematics. He is a professor at the University of Milan and is known for his studies on the works of Isaac Newton.

Guicciardini obtained his Ph.D. from Middlesex Polytechnic in 1987 under the supervision of Ivor Grattan-Guinness.

In 2011, he was awarded the Fernando Gil International Prize for the Philosophy of Science.

== Selected publications ==
- The development of Newtonian calculus in Britain, 1700-1800, Cambridge University Press, 1989 (paperback 2003).
- Reading the Principia: the debate on Newton's mathematical methods for natural philosophy from 1687 to 1736, Cambridge University Press, 1999 (paperback 2003).
- Isaac Newton on mathematical certainty and method, MIT Press, 2009 (paperback 2011).
