= Kohlschütter (crater) =

Crater on the Moon

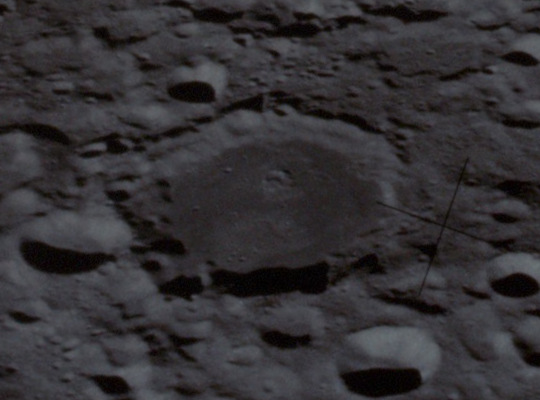
- Oblique Apollo 13 image, facing east
- Coordinates: 14.24°N 153.95°E
- Diameter: 56 km
- Depth: Unknown
- Colongitude: 206° at sunrise
- Formation: Nectarian
- Eponym: Arnold Kohlschütter

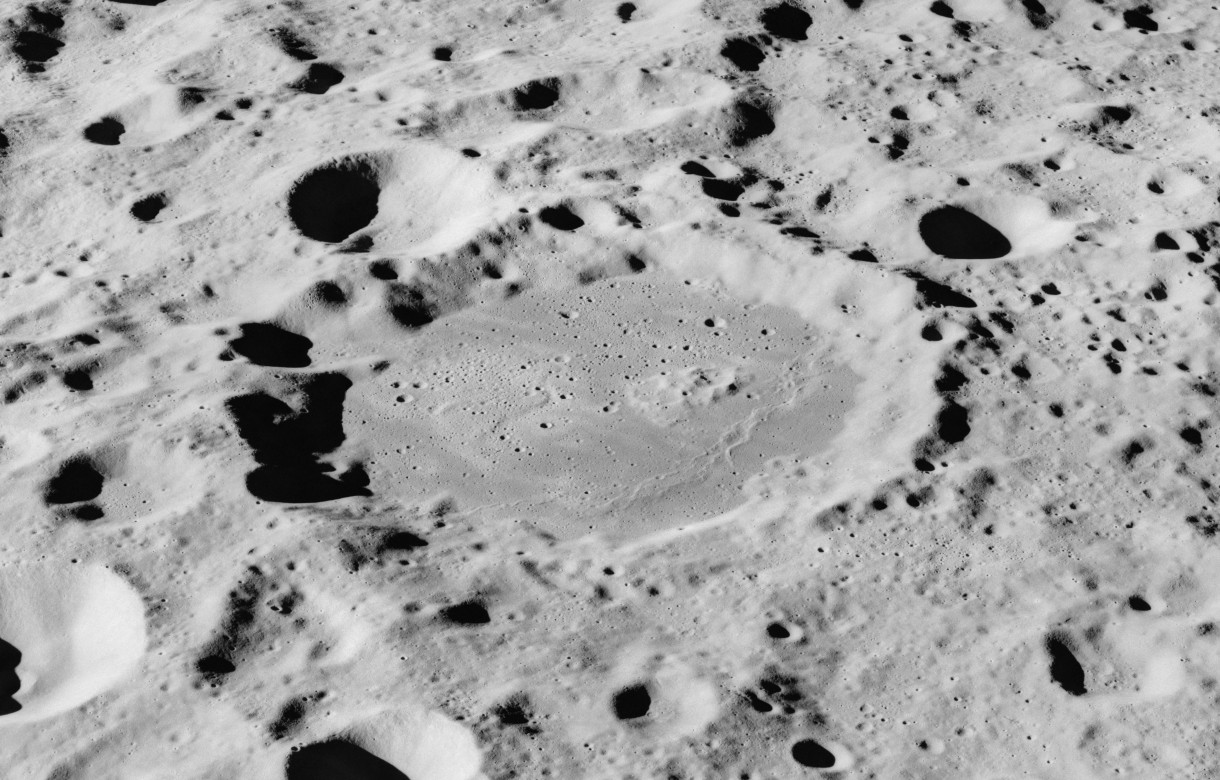
Oblique Apollo 16 image, facing north

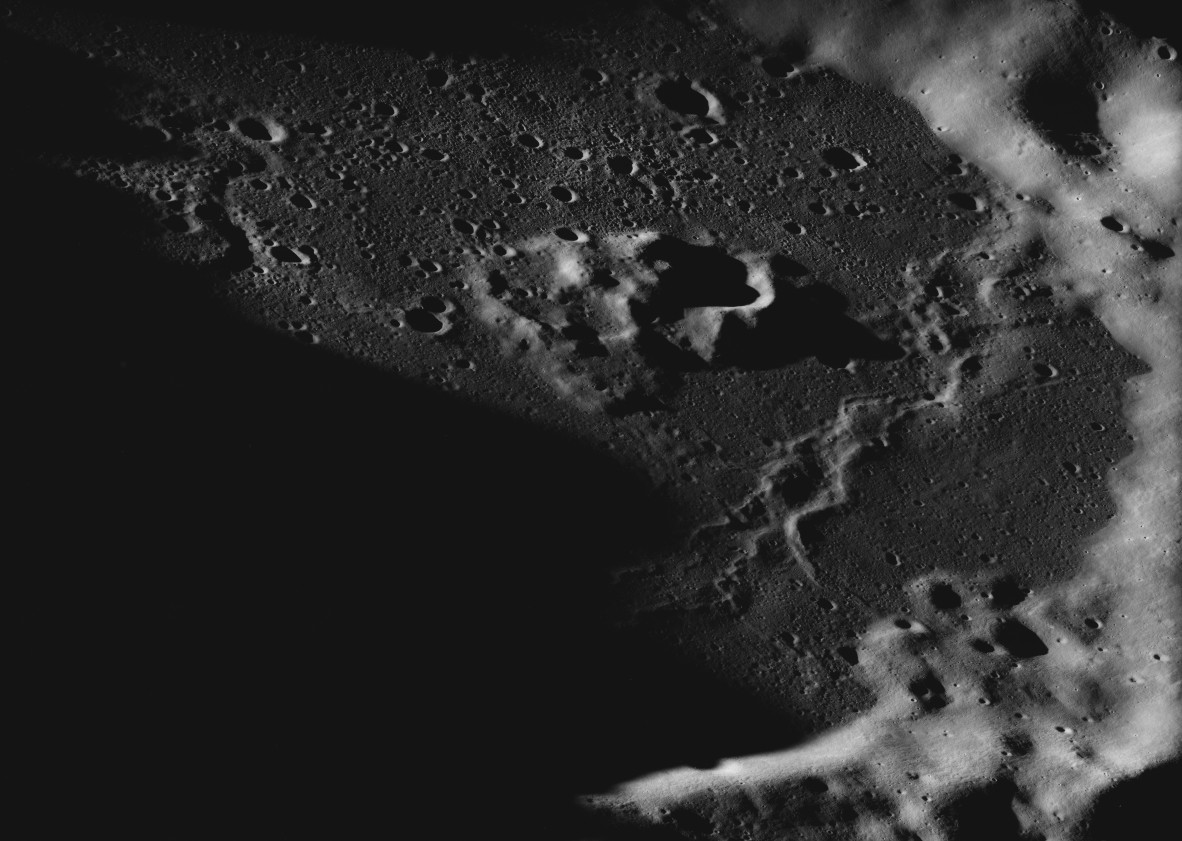
Oblique Apollo 16 image at low sun angle, which reveals the detail of the surface features within the crater. The light color at right is the base of the east wall of the crater and the dark field at left is shadow of west crater wall. The central peak is visible as well as part of a wrinkle ridge (dorsum) between the peak and rim.

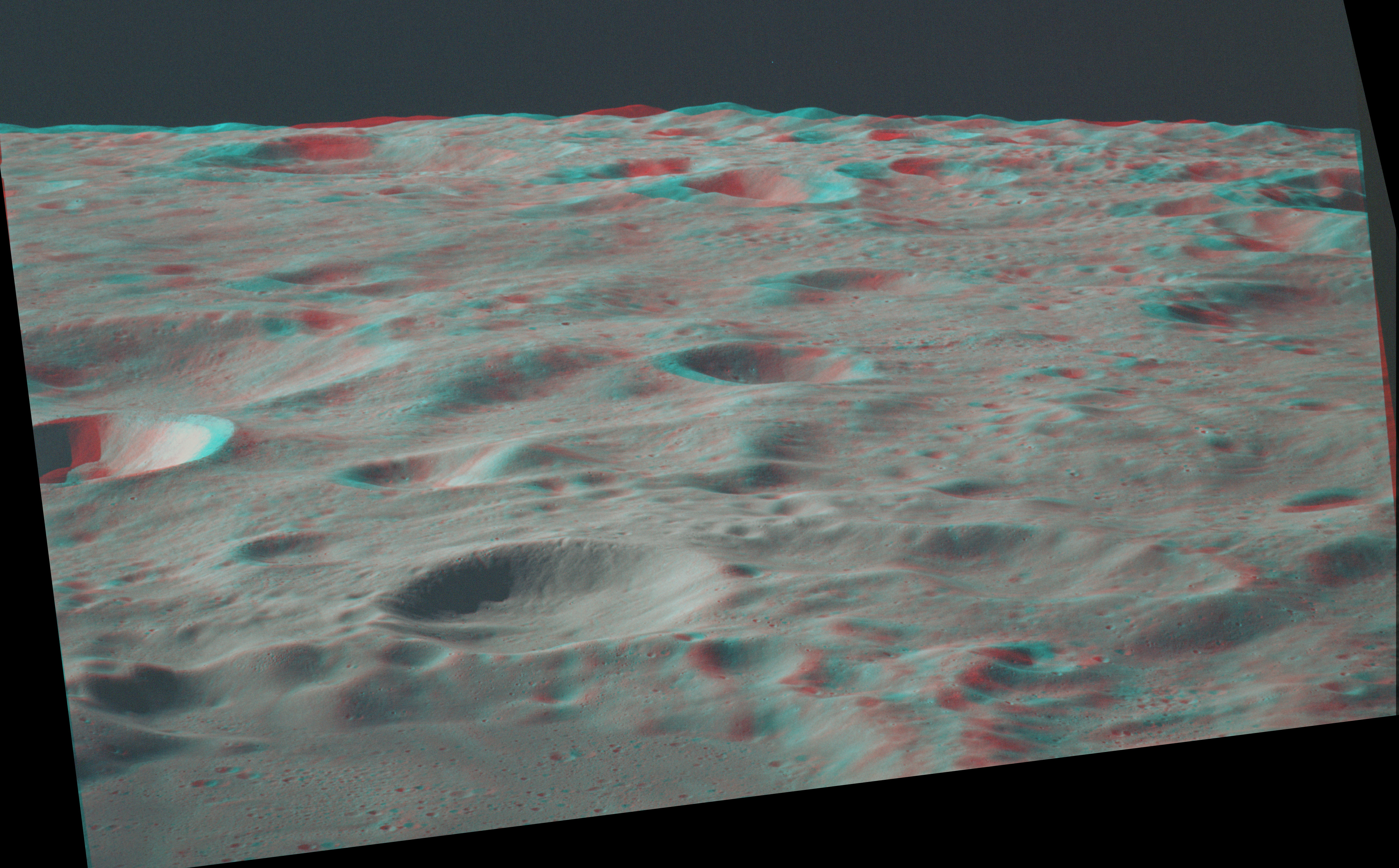
Anaglyph of part of Kohlschütter crater (left foreground) and the terrain north of it.

Kohlschütter is a lunar impact crater that cannot be viewed directly from the Earth as it lies on the Moon's far side. It is located a couple of hundred kilometers to the southeast of the Mare Moscoviense, and due south of the smaller crater Nagaoka. It is a relatively isolated formation surrounded by a multitude of smaller impacts typical of the battered far side.

On the lunar geologic timescale, Kohlschütter is a crater of Nectarian period. Its outer rim is worn and eroded, with a small crater across the northwest side, and smaller impacts along the west and northeastern edge. The southern rim is more shallow than elsewhere. The interior floor is relatively level, and unlike most far-side craters, it is filled with mare material. Despite its small size, the mare has a short sinuous rille west of the central peak and a wrinkle ridge east of it.

== Satellite craters ==
By convention these features are identified on lunar maps by placing the letter on the side of the crater midpoint that is closest to Kohlschütter.

Kohlschütter	Coordinates	Diameter, km
N	11.39°N 153.51°E	25.0
Q	12.91°N 152.75°E	18.3
V	15.41°N 151.61°E	19.0
W	16.15°N 151.02°E	31.2

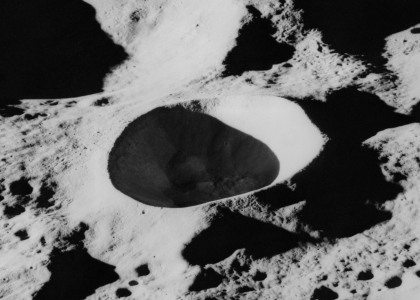
Kohlschütter V. Note that the west wall and floor are illuminated by reflected light from the east wall in this image from Apollo 16.
