= Kenneth O. May =

American mathematician and historian of mathematics (1915–1977)

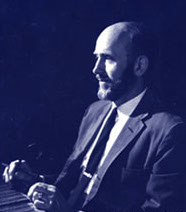
- Born: July 8, 1915; Portland, Oregon, US
- Died: December 1, 1977 (aged 62); Toronto, Ontario, Canada
- Education: University of California, Berkeley
- Known for: May's theorem
- Scientific career
- Workplaces: Carleton College; University of Toronto
- Thesis: On the Mathematical Theory of Employment (1946)
- Doctoral advisor: Griffith C. Evans

Kenneth Ownsworth May (July 8, 1915 – December 1, 1977) was an American mathematician and historian of mathematics, who developed May's theorem.

May was a prime mover behind the International Commission on the History of Mathematics, and was the first editor of its journal Historia Mathematica. Every four years the ICHM awards the Kenneth O. May Prize for outstanding contributions to the history of mathematics.

== Early life and education ==
Kenneth was born in 1915, the son of Samuel Chester "Sam" May (1887–1955) and Eleanor Ownsworth Perkin. His father, an alumnus of the University of Oregon and Yale Law School, practised law in Portland, Oregon beginning in 1913. After earning a Master of Arts degree from Columbia University, Sam in 1920 began teaching political science at Dartmouth College, and later at the University of California, Berkeley.

At the University of California, Kenneth May was elected to Phi Beta Kappa as a junior, and studied under Griffith C. Evans. May joined the Communist Party USA (CPUSA) and the Institute of Pacific Relations, of which he served as secretary from 1933. May's mother died in a gas heater explosion at home in 1935. The following year he was granted the A.B. degree and named to the Order of the Golden Bear. In 1937 May was granted a master's degree and was selected by the Institute of Current World Affairs for foreign study. He participated in a Russian seminar and expected to study in Russia, but those plans fell through and he took up study at the London School of Economics.

May was married on July 25, 1938. His wife, Ruth, had a leave of absence from her school for study at the Sorbonne, so the couple studied there for a year. In 1939 they travelled, including to Moscow where May visited the Kharkov Engineering-Economics Institute.

== Career ==
Returning to California, May became a teaching assistant, assigned to mathematics of finance and calculus with analytic geometry. May's work with the CPUSA led to alienation from his father and dismissal from his job. The affair received attention nationwide and was featured in a New York Times article. In 1942 he ran for California State Treasurer under the Communist banner. May's associations with J. Robert Oppenheimer were used as evidence in Oppenheimer's security clearance hearing. In World War II May attempted to join up, but until Ruth filed for divorce in June 1942, he could not be drafted. May's unit was sent to Kiska Island in the Aleutian chain. In May 1944, May married Jacqueline Bromley. His career in the military was recounted on page 4 of Stars and Stripes (Mediterranean Rome) on March 3, 1945.

In 1946 May submitted his thesis, Mathematical Theory of Employment for the Ph.D. He then received a teaching appointment at Carleton College in Northfield, Minnesota. As a protest against the Vietnam War, in 1966 May signed a vow of tax resistance. He moved to Canada the same year.

May is remembered for his Bibliography and Research Manual of the History of Mathematics (1973) published by University of Toronto Press. He made editorial contributions to the Encyclopedic Dictionary of Mathematics. He managed the compilation of an index for the first 80 volumes of American Mathematical Monthly and wrote numerous book reviews. Philip Enros compiled a bibliography of May's writings that was published in 1984.
