= Hans Wussing =

German historian of mathematics and science

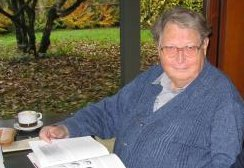
Hans Wussing.

Hans-Ludwig Wußing (October 15, 1927 in Waldheim – April 26, 2011 in Leipzig) was a German historian of mathematics and science.

== Life ==
Wussing graduated from high school, and from 1947 to 52 studied mathematics and physics at the University of Leipzig. Ernst Hölder was one of his teachers. In 1952 he took the state examination, and received his doctorate in 1957. His dissertation was on embedding finite groups. From 1956 to 1966 he was assistant at the Karl-Sudhoff Institute for the History of Medicine and Science at the University of Leipzig. He qualified as a professor there in 1966 with a ground-breaking work on the genesis of the abstract group concept. From 1966 to 1968 Wußing was lecturer, and from 1968 professor, of history of mathematics and natural sciences.

In 1969, his book Genesis of the Abstract Group Concept was published in German; it was translated by Abe Shenitzer and Hardy Grant in 1984. B.H. Newman wrote in Mathematical Reviews (see external link below) that Wussing's "main thesis, ably defended and well documented, is that the roots of the abstract notion of a group do not lie, as frequently assumed, only in the theory of algebraic equations, but they are also to be found in the geometry and in the theory of numbers at the end of the 18th and the first half of the 19th centuries". Newman comments that Wussings bibliography is "oddly arranged". Newman also notes that a broader perspective on the topic would require reading the works of George Abram Miller.

Promoted from a department head at the Karl-Sudhoff Institute, he headed the institute from 1977 to 1982. In 1971 he became a corresponding member of the International Academy of the History of Science, and a regular member in 1981. In 1984 he became a full member of the Saxon Academy of Sciences in Leipzig. Wussing retired in 1992.

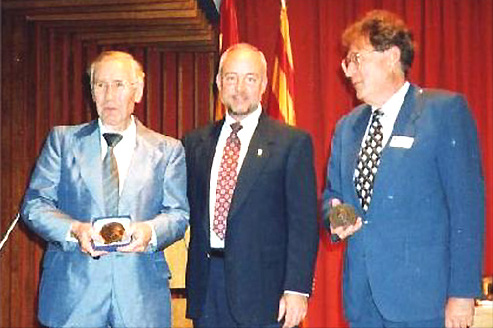
Christoph Scriba, Joseph Dauben, and Hans Wussing at the 19th International Congress of History of Science in Zaragoza, Spain 1993

Wussing is the author of numerous scientific historical publications, the author of many mathematicians' biographies, and co-editor of several series of publications, including biographies in the Teubner Verlag, and several volumes in the series Klassiker der exakten Wissenschaften (Ostwald's Classics of the Exact Sciences), in particular on Euler's work on functional theory, Gauss's diary, and Felix Klein's Erlangen program. In 1993 he was awarded the Kenneth O. May Prize. Until 1998 he was Chairman of the Commission for the History of Science at the Saxon Academy of Sciences. He was also involved in the publication of Johann Christian Poggendorff's Biographical and Literary Pocket Dictionary of the History of Exact Sciences.

His doctoral students include Walter Purkert.

== Writings ==
- 1962: Mathematics in the period of slave society, Leipzig, Teubner, and Aachen, Mayer.
- 1969: Die Genesis des abstrackten Gruppenbegriffes. Ein Beitrag zur Entstehungsgeschichte der abstrakten Gruppentheorie.
  - 1984: The Genesis of the abstract group concept, MIT Press
- 1973: Nicholas Copernicus, Leipzig, Urania
- 1974: Carl Friedrich Gauss, Leipzig, Teubner, second Edition 1976
- 1975: (editor with Wolfgang Arnold) Biographien bedeutender Mathematiker – eine Sammlung von Biographien, 4th edition, Berlin, Volk und Wissen 1989.
- 1977: Isaac Newton, Leipzig, Teubner, 4th Edition 1990
- 1987: Editor: History of Science, Cologne, Aulis Verlag.
- 1989: Vorlesungen der Geschichte der Mathematik, Deutscher Verlag der Wissenschaften.
- 1989: Adam Ries, Leipzig, Teubner, 1992, 3rd, revised and expanded edition, Leipzig Edition on Gutenbergplatz 2009 (Eagle 033)
- 1992: (editor) Fachlexikon ABC Forscher und Erfinder, Frankfurt, Verlag Harri Deutsch.
- 2002: The major renovation – on the history of the scientific revolution, Birkhäuser.
- 2003: (with H. W. Alten, A. Djafari Naini, Folkerts, H. Schlosser, K.-H. Chimneys): 4000 years Algebra, Springer Verlag.
- 2008,9: Mathematics 6000 years – a cultural and historical journey through time, 2 vols, Springer
- 2009: Eagle Guide From Gauss to Poincaré – Mathematics and Industrial Revolution, Leipzig Edition on Gutenbergplatz (Eagle 037)
- 2010: Eagle Guide From Leonardo da Vinci and Galileo Galilei. Mathematics and Renaissance, Leipzig Edition on Gutenbergplatz (Eagle 041)
- 2011: Carl Friedrich Gauss. Biography and document, Leipzig Edition on Gutenbergplatz (Eagle 051)
  - The 60-page appendix "CF Gauss and BG Teubner" for the 200th anniversary of its founding on February 21, 1811, in Leipzig.
