= Helmuth Gericke =

German mathematician

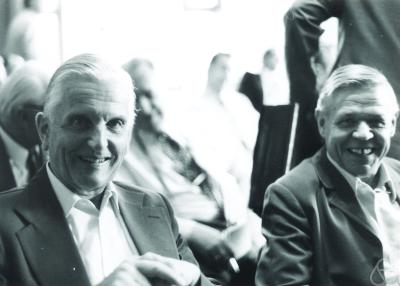
- Gericke (right) with Hermann Boerner, 14 Jun 1975
- Born: 7 May 1909; Aachen, German Empire
- Died: 15 August 2007 (aged 98); Freiburg, Germany
- Scientific career
- Thesis: Über den Volta-Effekt (1932)
- Doctoral students: Wolfgang Bibel; Ivo Schneider

Paul Fritz Helmuth Gericke (7 May 1909 – 15 August 2007) was a German mathematician and a historian of mathematics.

== Life ==
Gericke was born in Aachen on 7 May 1909. From 1926 to 1931, he studied physics and mathematics at the University of Greifswald, Marburg University, and the University of Göttingen. In 1931, he obtained his doctorate with a thesis on the Volta effect. In 1934, he was an assistant to Wilhelm Süss in Freiburg. With Süss, he attained his habilitation in pure mathematics in 1941. After 1945, he helped Süss to further develop the Mathematical Research Institute Oberwolfach. His interest in the history of mathematics was aroused by the work of Joseph Ehrenfried Hofmann, whom he had met in Oberwolfach in 1945 and 1946. In 1947, he began to hold lectures in Freiburg on topics related to the history of mathematics. He also received support from Heinrich Behnke, which enabled him to publish his work.

In 1952, he was appointed associate professor at the University of Freiburg. He took a professorship at LMU Munich in 1963, where he was appointed as the first Professor of the History of Science. There he founded the Institute for the History of Science. In 1964, against his stated will, he was chosen as deputy chairman of the German Society for the History of Medicine, Science and Technology. In 1977, he became professor emeritus. He began his professional career working on differential geometry and the body of complex numbers, but from 1947 he devoted himself to subjects in the history of mathematics, publishing several books in this field. His focus was on the development of mathematics in Ancient Greece and the mathematics of the 19th century.

He died in Freiburg on 15 August 2007 at the age of 98.

== Writings ==
- Über den Volta-Effekt, Coburg (1932)
- 9 Sonderabdrucke 1935 – 1953 (Contents: Über die größte Kugel in einer konvexen Punktmenge (1935) – Zur Arbeit von P. Ganapathi : A Note on the Oval (1935), Einige kennzeichnende Eigenschaften des Kreises (1935), Über ein Konvergenzkriterium (1937), Über eine Ungleichung für gemischte Volumina (1937), Stützbare Bereiche in komplexer Fourier-Darstellung (1940), Algebraische Betrachtungen zu den Aristotelischen Syllogismen (1952), Einige Grundgedanken der modernen Algebra (1952), Über den Begriff der algebraischen Struktur (1953))
- Zur Geschichte der Mathematik an der Universität Freiburg im Breisgau (with E. Albert, 1955)
- Theorie der Verbände, Mannheim (1963)
- Die Entwicklung physikalischer Begriffe bei den Griechen, Göttingen (1965)
- Geschichte des Zahlbegriffs, Mannheim (1970)
- 50 Jahre GAMM (Gesellschaft für Angewandte Mathematik und Mechanik) as editor, Munich (1972)
- Aus der Chronik der Deutschen Mathematiker-Vereinigung, Stuttgart (1980)
- Mathematik in Antike und Orient, Berlin (1984)
- Mathematik im Abendland. Von den römischen Feldmessern bis zu Descartes, Berlin (1990)
- Mathematik in Antike, Orient und Abendland, Wiesbaden (2003; reprint of the individual volumes [1984] and [1990])

== Sources ==
- Folkerts: Obituary for Helmuth Gericke, in mathematical lmu.de (page 9/10)
- Siegfried Gottwald, Hans-Joachim Ilgauds, Karl-Heinz Schlote, glossary of important mathematicians, Leipzig, 1990

== Literature ==
- Folkerts, mathemata: Festschrift for Helmuth Gericke, Stuttgart, 1985
- De Thiende, the first textbook of Dezimalbruchrechnung after the Dutch and the French edition of 1585, with Simon Stevin and Kurt Vogel, Wiesbaden, 1965
