= Adolph P. Yushkevich =

Soviet historian of mathematics (1906–1993)

A. P. Yushkevich

Adolph-Andrei Pavlovich Yushkevich (Russian: Адо́льф-Андре́й Па́влович Юшке́вич; 15 July 1906 – 17 July 1993) was a Soviet historian of mathematics, leading expert in medieval mathematics of the East and the work of Leonhard Euler. He is a winner of George Sarton Medal by the History of Science Society for a lifetime of scholarly achievement.

== Biography ==
Yushkevich was born in Odessa, Russian Empire to a Jewish family. His father was Pavel Yushkevich a Sorbonne-educated philosopher and a mathematician, active in politics as a Menshevik who was in "ssylka" (deportation) in Siberia, and later in France. His uncle, Semen Solomonovich Yushkevich was a well-known Jewish writer. Yushkevich grew up in St. Petersburg and later in Paris where he lived until Russian Revolution of 1917, when Yushkevich family returned to Odessa. For a time, Sofya Yanovskaya was one of Adolf's teachers in a gymnasium.

In 1923, Yushkevich started his studies at the Department of Mathematics of Moscow State University. His doctoral advisor was Dmitri Egorov, but he was awarded a Ph.D. degree without a defense. From 1930 to 1952 he worked at Bauman Technical University where he rose to professorship in 1940 and head of the department of mathematics in 1941. In the years 1941–1943 he was evacuated to Izhevsk, together with the whole Bauman Technical University. Starting 1952, he became a full-time researcher at Vavilov Institute of Natural History, where he worked until retirement.

Yushkevich published over 300 works in history of mathematics. For his work, he received numerous honors, including George Sarton Medal (1978), Koyré Medal by the International Academy of the History of Science (1971), May Prize (1989) by the International Commission on the History of Mathematics, Prize of the German Academy of Sciences Berlin (twice, in 1978 and 1983), and Prize of the French Academy of Sciences (1982). He was a member of several foreign academies, including German Academy of Sciences Leopoldina, and president of the International Academy of the History of Science (1965–1968).

Yushkevich died in Moscow in 1993. He bequeathed his personal library to the Vavilov Institute.
