= Roshdi Rashed =

Egyptian-French mathematician, philosopher and historian of science (born 1936)

- رشدي راشد
- Born: 5 April 1936 (age 90); Cairo, Egypt
- Awards: Kenneth O. May Prize; Sheikh Zayed Book Award

Academic work
- Discipline: mathematics philosophy history of science
- Institutions: French National Centre for Scientific Research; Paris Diderot University; Tokyo University; Mansoura University
- Doctoral students: Hélène Bellosta
- Main interests: medieval Arab science
- Notable works: Arabic Sciences and Philosophy

Roshdi Rashed (Arabic: رشدي راشد), born in Cairo in 1936, is a mathematician, philosopher and historian of science, whose work focuses largely on mathematics and physics of the medieval Arab world. His work explores and illuminates the unrecognized Arab scientific tradition, being one of the first historians to study in detail the ancient and medieval texts, their journey through the Eastern schools and courses, their immense contributions to Western science, particularly in regarding the development of algebra and the first formalization of physics.

== Biography ==
Roshdi Rashed is the author of several books and scientific articles in History of Science. He is currently Emeritus Director of Research (special class) at CNRS (France). He was director of the Centre for History of Arab and Medieval Science and Philosophies (until 2001) Paris, and also director of the doctoral formation in epistemology and history of science, Paris Diderot University (until 2001). He is Emeritus Professor at Tokyo University, and at the Mansoura University, and also at the Paris Diderot University. He was a founder (1984) and Director (until May 1993) of the REHSEIS (Research Epistemology and History of Science and Scientific Institutions) research team, CNRS, Paris. He had several distinctions including: the CNRS Bronze medal (1977), Knight of the Honour Legion (1989), the Alexandre Koyré Medal of the International Academy of the History of Science (1990), the history of science medal and award of the Academy of Sciences for the Developing World (1990), medal and award of Kuwait Foundation for the Advancement of Sciences (1999), Avicenna gold medal of UNESCO (1999), medal of CNRS (2001), medal of the Arab World Institute (2004). He had several honorary positions as Vice-President of the International Academy of the History of Science (1997), member of the Royal Belgian Academy of Sciences (2002), member of the Tunisian Academy "Bayt al-Hikma" (2012), and the Kenneth O. May Prize (2017).

== Editorial activity ==
Founding executive editor, with Basim Musallam, of the journal Arabic Sciences and Philosophy, Cambridge University Press (UK), ISSN 0957-4239.

Editor of the series "History of the Arab Sciences", Beirut (Lebanon). Director of Collections "Arab Science and Philosophy. Studies and times" and "Arab Science and Philosophy. Texts and Studies", Les Belles Lettres (France). Editor of the series "Science in history", Blanchard (France).

Committee member reading of the "Revue de synthèse" (Springer Verlag), and the "Historia Scientiarum" (WHSO record number 30031), and also the "Journal de l’histoire des mathématiques" published by the "Société Mathématique de France" (Journal of the History of Mathematics published by the Mathematical Society of France).

== Books ==
- "Introduction to the History of Science," co-author.
  - "Vol. 1: Elements and Instruments", Hachette, Paris, 1971.
  - "Vol. 2: Purpose and methods. Examples", Hachette, Paris, 1972.
- "Al-Bahir in Algebra As-Samaw'al", with S. Ahmad, University Press of Damascus, Damascus, 1972.
- "Condorcet: Mathematics and Society", Collection "Knowledge", Hermann, Paris, 1974, Spanish translation, 1990.
- "The Art of Algebra Diophantus", National Library, Cairo, 1975.
- "The Work algebraic al-Khayyam", in collaboration with A. Djebbar, University Press of Aleppo, Aleppo, 1981.
- "Between Arithmetic and Algebra. Research on the History of Arabic Mathematics", Collection "Arabic Sciences and Philosophy. Studies and included", Les Belles Lettres, Paris 1984. (ISBN 2251355316)
  - Arabic translation: Beirut, 1989
  - English translation: Kluwer, Boston Studies in Philosophy of Science, 1994.
  - Japanese Translation: Tokyo University Press, in press.
- "Diophantus: The Arithmetic, Book IV", "Vol. 3: Collection Universities of France", Les Belles Lettres, Paris, 1984.
- "Diophantus: The Arithmetic, Books V, VI, VII", "Vol 4: Collection Universities of France", Les Belles Lettres, Paris, 1984.
- "Studies on Avicenna", directed by J. Jolivet and R. Rashed, collection "Arabic Sciences and Philosophy - Studies and included", Les Belles Lettres, Paris, 1984.
- "Mathematics of Sharaf al-Din al-Tusi. Algebra and Geometry in the twelfth century", Vol. I Collection "Arabic Sciences and Philosophy - Texts and Studies", Les Belles Lettres, Paris, 1986. (ISBN 2251355626)
  - Arabic translation: Beirut, 1998.
- "Mathematics of Sharaf al-Din al-Tusi. Algebra and Geometry in the twelfth century", Vol. II Collection "Arabic Sciences and Philosophy - Texts and Studies", Les Belles Lettres, Paris, 1986.
  - Arabic translation: Beirut, 1998 .
- "Optics and Mathematics: Research on the history of scientific thought in Arabic," Variorum reprints, Aldershot, 1992.
- "Geometry and Dioptrics the tenth century: Ibn Sahl al-Quhi and Ibn al-Haytham," Les Belles Lettres, Paris, 1993.
  - Arabic translation: Beirut, 1996
- "The Mathematics of infinitesimal, ninth to eleventh centuries", "Vol. II: Ibn al-Haytham", al-Furqan Islamic Heritage Foundation, London, 1993.
  - Arabic translation in progress.
- "The Mathematics of infinitesimal, ninth to eleventh centuries", "Vol. I: Founders and commentators Banu Musa, Thabit ibn Qurra, Ibn Sinan al-Khazin, al-Quhi, Ibn al-Samh, Ibn Hud", al-Furqan Islamic Heritage Foundation, London, 1996.
  - Arabic translation in progress.
- "Encyclopedia of the History of Arabic Science", 3 vols. (Editor and co-author), Routledge, London and New York, 1996 (ISBN 0415020638).
  - "Vol. 1: Astronomy - Theoretical and Applied "
  - "Vol. 2: Mathematics and the physical sciences "
  - "Vol. 3: Technology, alchemy and the life sciences "
  - French translation: "History of Arabic Science", 3 vols., Le Seuil, Paris, 1997. (ISBN 2-02-030355-8)
  - Arabic translation: "Mawsu'a Tarikh al-'ulum al-' arabiyya" 3 vols., Markaz Dirasat al-Wahda al-'arabiyya, Beirut, 1997. (ISBN 9953450730)
  - Persian translation: in press in Tehran.
  - Polish translation: 2000.
- "Philosophical and scientific works of al-Kindi", "Vol. I: Optics and Catoptrics al-Kindi ", EJ Brill, Leiden, 1997.
- "Descartes and the Middle Ages", J. Biard and R. Rashed (ed.), Vrin, Paris, 1997.
- "Philosophical and scientific works of al-Kindi", "Vol. II: Metaphysics and Cosmology, "with J. Jolivet, EJ Brill, Leiden, 1998.
- "The Doctrines of science from antiquity to the classical age," R. Rashed and J. Biard (ed.), Peeters, Leuven, 1999.
- "Al-Khayyam mathematician", in collaboration with B. Vahabzadeh, Bookstore Blanchard, Paris, 1999.
  - English Version: "Omar Khayyam. The Mathematician ", Persian Heritage Series No. 40, Bibliotheca Persica Press, New York, 2000.
- "The Greek Catoptriciens. I: burning mirrors, editing, translation and commentary", Collection of the Universities of France, published under the auspices of the Association Guillaume Bude, Les Belles Lettres, Paris, 2000.
- "Ibrahim ibn Sinan. Logic and geometry in the tenth century ", in collaboration with Hélène Bellosta, EJ Brill, Leiden, 2000.
- "The Mathematics of infinitesimal, ninth to eleventh centuries", "Vol. III: Ibn al-Haytham. Theory of conics, geometric constructions and practical geometry ", London, 2000.
- "The Mathematics of infinitesimal, ninth to eleventh centuries", "Vol. IV: Methods geometric point transformations and philosophy of mathematics ", London, 2002.
- "Storia della scienza", "Vol. III: Civiltà islamica", scientific management and co-author Enciclopedia Italiana, Rome, 2002.
- "Research and teaching of mathematics in the ninth century. Collection of proposals Na'im ibn Musa geometric", in collaboration with C. Houzel, Les Cahiers du Mideo 2, Louvain-Paris, 2004.
- :Mathematical work of al-Sijzî. Vol. I: conical geometry and number theory in the tenth century", Les Cahiers du Mideo 3, Peeters, Louvain-Paris, 2004.
- "Klasik Avrupali Modernitenin Icadi ve Islam'da Bilim", a collection of articles translated into Turkish by Bekir S. Gür, Kadim Yayinlari, Ankara, 2005.
- "Geometry and Dioptrics in Classical Islam", al-Furqan, London, 2005.
- "Philosophy of mathematics and theory of knowledge. The Works of Jules Vuillemin", R. Rashed and P. Pellegrin (eds.), Science in History Collection, Library A. Blanchard, Paris, 2005.
- "Philosophical studies. History of science", Tunisian Academy Beit al-Hikma and UNESCO Chair of Philosophy, Carthage, 2005.
- "Mathematics infinitesimal from the ninth to the eleventh century", "Vol. V: Ibn al-Haytham: spherical geometry and astronomy", al-Furqan Islamic Heritage Foundation, London, 2006.
- "From Al-Khwarizmi to Descartes. Studies on the history of mathematics", classical Editions Hermann, 2011.
- "Founding Figures and Commentators in Arabic Mathematics: A History of Arabic Sciences and Mathematics", Routledge Publishing, 2011. (ISBN 0415582172)
- "Arabic Geometrical Methods and the Philosophy of Mathematics: A History of Arabic Sciences and Mathematics", Routledge Publishing, 2013. (ISBN 0415582164)
- "Ibn Al-Haytham's Theory of Conics, Geometrical Constructions and Practical Geometry: A History of Arabic Sciences and Mathematics", Routledge Publishing, 2013. (ISBN 0415582156)
