= Alain Berthoz =

French Neurophysiologist

Alain Berthoz (born 18 February 1939 in Neuilly-sur-Seine) is a French engineer and neurophysiologist.

He graduated from the elite engineering École Nationale Supérieure des Mines de Nancy (N60), (or Nancy School of Mines), and has been a member of the French Academy of Sciences since 2003, and the Academy of Technology since 2010. He is an honorary professor at the Collège de France.

== Biography ==
As a neurophysiologist, Berthoz is one of the leading specialists in integrative physiology. His research has focused on multisensory control of gaze, balance, locomotion and spatial memory.

== Diplomas and career paths ==
- Civil Engineer of the Mines of Nancy (1963)
- Doctor of Natural Sciences (1973) (Paris)
- Director of the Neurosensory Physiology Laboratory of the CNRS.
- Professor at the Collège de France (1993-2009)

== Bibliography (not exhaustive) ==
- Notice A. Berthoz[archive] on the BnF website
- Le Sens du mouvement, Éd. Odile Jacob, 1997
- The Decision, Ed. Odile Jacob, 2003
- L'Empathie, Éditions Odile Jacob, 2004, (ISBN 9782738114853), under the direction of Alain Berthoz and Gérard Jorland
- Phénoménologie et physiologie de l'action, Alain Berthoz, Jean-Luc Petit, Odile Jacob, 2006
- La simplexité, Éd. Odile Jacob, 2009
- La Vicariance, le cerveau créateur de monde, Éd. Odile Jacob, 2013
- Complexity-Simplexity, Alain Berthoz (dir.) and Jean-Luc Petit (dir.), Collège de France (Conférences), 2014, DOI:10.4000/books.cdf.3339 - "volume "companion" of La simplexité

=== Contributions ===
- Preface to Ombre à n dimensions by Stéphane Sangral, Éd. Galilée, 2014
- Regards sur le sport, collective, directed by Benjamin Pichery and François L'Yvonnet, Le Pommier/INSEP 2010, 256 p. (ISBN 978-2-7465-0484-4)

== Honours and awards ==
=== Distinctions ===
- Elected member of the International Academy of Astronautics (1994)
- Elected member of the Academia Europaea (1994)
- Correspondent member of the French Academy of sciences (Paris, 1999) and member in 2003

=== Awards and medals ===
- Silver medal of the National Centre for Space Studies (1985)
- La Caze Prize of the French Academy of sciences (Paris, 1987)
- General Prize of the Academy of Medicine (Paris, 1991)
- Daw Award for Neuroscience (USA, 1996)
- International Prize for Neurology of the University of Pavia (1998)
- Grand Prix du CEA of the French Academy of sciences (Paris, 1998)
- Officer of the Order of the Legion of Honour (2011)
- Officer of the Ordre National du Mérite
