= David E. Rowe =

American mathematician

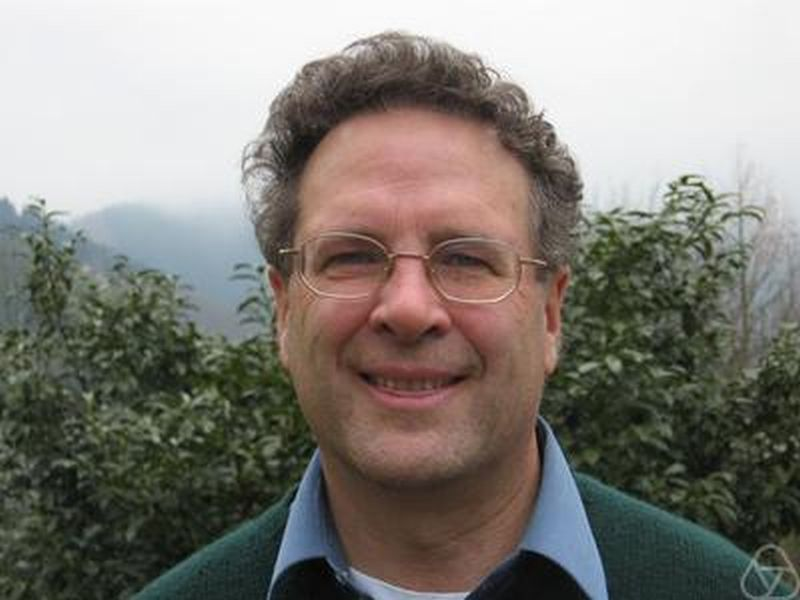
Rowe in Oberwolfach, 2005

David E. Rowe (born August 11, 1950) is an American mathematician and historian. He studied mathematics and the history of science at the University of Oklahoma, and he took a second doctorate in history at the Graduate Center of the City University of New York. He served as book review editor, managing editor, and editor of the journal Historia Mathematica. In 1992, Rowe was appointed Professor of History of Mathematics and Natural Sciences at the Johannes Gutenberg University in Mainz. His research has mainly focused on mathematics in Germany, but in recent years he has been concerned with Albert Einstein's general theory of relativity and the broader cultural and political impact of Einstein's ideas. As part of this effort, he and Robert Schulmann have co-edited a source book entitled Einstein on Politics: His Private Thoughts and Public Stands on Nationalism, Zionism, War, Peace, and the Bomb, published by Princeton University Press in 2007.

He has lectured at Oxford University, most recently in November 2026 about the origins of the Riemann Hypothesis.

== Publications ==
- Rowe, David E. (2026) Bernhard Riemann: His Life and Wondrous Mathematical Legacy Springer.
- Rowe, David E.; Schulmann, Robert J. (2007). Einstein on politics : his private thoughts and public stands on nationalism, Zionism, war, peace, and the bomb. Princeton: Princeton University Press. ISBN 978-0-691-12094-2. OCLC 76901991.
- Parshall, Karen Hunger; Rowe, David E. (1994). The emergence of the American mathematical research community, 1876-1900 : J.J. Sylvester, Felix Klein, and E.H. Moore. Providence, R.I.: American Mathematical Society. ISBN 0-8218-9004-2. OCLC 29796059.
- Rowe, David E.; McCleary, John; Knobloch, Eberhard (1989). The history of modern mathematics : proceedings of the Symposium on the History of Modern Mathematics, Vassar College, Poughkeepsie, New York, June 20-24, 1989. Boston: Academic Press. ISBN 0-12-599661-6. OCLC 20220643.
- Rowe, David E. (1989). "Klein, Hilbert, and the Gottingen Mathematical Tradition". Osiris. 5. University of Chicago Press: 186–213. doi:10.1086/368687. ISSN 0369-7827. S2CID 121068952.
- Rowe, David E. (2018). A richer picture of mathematics : the Göttingen tradition and beyond. Cham, Switzerland. ISBN 978-3-319-67819-1. OCLC 1023427941.
- Rowe, David E.; Koreuber, Mechthild (2020). Proving it her way : Emmy Noether, a life in mathematics. Cham, Switzerland. ISBN 978-3-030-62811-6.
- Rowe, David E. (2021). Emmy Noether -- mathematician extraordinaire. Cham, Switzerland. ISBN 978-3-030-63810-8.
- Rowe, D.E. (2023). On Felix Klein’s Early Geometrical Works, 1869–1872. In: Chemla, K., Ferreirós, J., Ji, L., Scholz, E., Wang, C. (eds) The Richness of the History of Mathematics. Archimedes, vol 66. Springer, Cham. https://doi.org/10.1007/978-3-031-40855-7_6
