= Kurt Vogel (historian) =

German historian of mathematics (1888–1985)

Kurt Vogel (30 September 1888 – 27 October 1985) was a German historian of mathematics.

== Life and work ==
Vogel was born in Altdorf bei Nürnberg to Johann Georg Vogel and Ehefrau Maria. He attended school in Bayreuth, Schwabach, and Ansbach. From 1907 to 1911, he studied mathematics and physics with Max Noether, Paul Gordan, and Erhard Schmidt in Erlangen, and with Felix Klein, David Hilbert, and Otto Toeplitz in Göttingen. He passed his examination to become a schoolteacher in 1911, then served as an army officer from 1913 to 1920 before taking a teaching post in Munich.

In 1940, Vogel was appointed to a professorship at the Ludwig-Maximilians-Universität München, where he spent the remainder of his career. He studied a variety of mathematical texts from Babylonian, Egyptian, Greek, and Chinese scholars, such as the Rhind Mathematical Papyrus. Self-taught in several ancient languages, Vogel produced German translations of al-Khwarizmi's On the Calculation with Hindu Numerals (from the Latin translation, Algoritmi de numero Indorum), and the Chinese treatise The Nine Chapters on the Mathematical Art. Vogel officially retired from his post in 1963, but founded and led the university's Institute for the History of Natural Science and Mathematics until 1970.

In 1969, he was awarded the George Sarton Medal for his contributions to the history of science.
