= Historia Mathematica =

- Discipline: History of mathematics
- Language: English
- Edited by: Nathan Sidoli, Reinhard Siegmund-Schultze

Publication details
- Former name: Notae de Historia Mathematica
- History: 1974—present
- Publisher: Elsevier
- Frequency: Quarterly
- Impact factor: 0.639 (2020)

Standard abbreviations
- ISO 4: Hist. Math.
- MathSciNet: Historia Math.

Indexing
- CODEN: HIMADS
- ISSN: 0315-0860
- LCCN: 75642280
- OCLC no.: 2240703

Links
- Journal homepage; Online access

Historia Mathematica: International Journal of History of Mathematics is an academic journal on the history of mathematics published by Elsevier. It was established by Kenneth O. May in 1971 as the free newsletter Notae de Historia Mathematica, but by its sixth issue in 1974 had turned into a full journal.

The International Commission on the History of Mathematics began awarding the Montucla Prize, for the best article by an early career scholar in Historia Mathematica, in 2009. The award is given every four years.

== Editors ==
The editors of the journal have been:

- Kenneth O. May (1974–1977)
- Joseph W. Dauben (1977–1985)
- Eberhard Knobloch (1985–1994)
- David E. Rowe (1994–1996)
- Karen Hunger Parshall (1996–2000)
- Craig Fraser and Umberto Bottazzini (2000–2004)
- Craig Fraser (2004–2007)
- Benno van Dalen (2007–2009)
- June Barrow-Green and Niccolò Guicciardini (2010–2013)
- Niccolò Guicciardini and Tom Archibald (2013–2015)
- Tom Archibald and Reinhard Siegmund-Schultze (2016–present)

== Abstracting and indexing ==
The journal is abstracted and indexed in Mathematical Reviews, SCISEARCH, and Scopus.
