= Archive for History of Exact Sciences =

- Discipline: History of science
- Language: English
- Edited by: J.Z. Buchwald, J.J. Gray

Publication details
- History: 1960-present
- Publisher: Springer Science+Business Media
- Frequency: Bimonthly
- Impact factor: 0.594 (2020)

Standard abbreviations
- ISO 4: Arch. Hist. Exact Sci.

Indexing
- CODEN: AHESAN
- ISSN: 0003-9519 (print); 1432-0657 (web)
- JSTOR: 00039519
- OCLC no.: 243416476

Links
- Journal homepage; Online access

Archive for History of Exact Sciences is a peer-reviewed academic journal currently published bimonthly by Springer Science+Business Media, covering the history of mathematics and of astronomy observations and techniques, epistemology of science, and philosophy of science from Antiquity until now. It was established in 1960 and the current editors-in-chief are Jed Z. Buchwald and Jeremy Gray.

== Abstracting and indexing ==
The journal is abstracted and indexed in:

- Science Citation Index
- Arts and Humanities Citation Index
- Scopus
- Zentralblatt MATH
- EBSCO databases
- Academic OneFile
- Current Contents/Arts and Humanities
- Current Contents/Physical, Chemical and Earth Sciences
- Current Index to Statistics
- FRANCIS
- INIS Atomindex
- International Bibliography of Periodical Literature
- Mathematical Reviews

According to the Journal Citation Reports, the journal has a 2020 impact factor of 0.594.
