= Menso Folkerts =

German mathematician

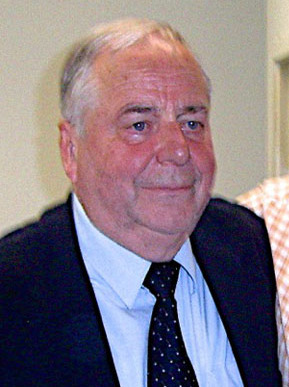
- Folkerts in 2013
- Born: June 22, 1943; Germany
- Occupation: Mathematician

Menso Folkerts (born 22 June 1943) is a German mathematical historian and writer of popular science books.

== Early life ==
Menso Folkerts was born on June 22, 1943, in Eschwege, Germany. From 1962 to 1967 he studied classical philology, mathematics and historical auxiliary sciences at the University of Göttingen.

== Career ==
From 1980 to 2008 he was a professor at LMU Munich.

He contibruted to the Encyclopedia Britannica.

Folkerts completed a database of over 7000 letters written by or sent to Gauss, which can be accessed on the internet.

== Awards and honours ==
He received the Kenneth O. May Prize in 2013. His scholarship has been recognized by various academies. For example, he is a Member of the International Academy of the History of Science, and the German National Academy of Sciences Leopoldina.

== Bibliography ==
His publications include:

- Essays on Early Medieval Mathematics: The Latin Tradition
- Sourcebook in the Mathematics of Medieval Europe and North Africa
