= International Commission on the History of Mathematics =

Organization to promote the study of history of mathematics

The International Commission on the History of Mathematics was established in 1971 to promote the study of history of mathematics. Kenneth O. May provided its initial impetus. In 1974, its official journal Historia Mathematica began publishing. Every four years the Commission bestows the Kenneth O. May Medal upon a deserving historian of mathematics.

In 1981, in Bucharest, the first in a series of symposia was held in conjunction with the International Congress of History of Science. In 1985, the ICHM became an inter-union commission of both the International Mathematical Union and the International Union of History and Philosophy of Science. In 1989 the first Kenneth O. May Prize was awarded to Dirk Struik and Adolf P. Yushkevich.

Joseph Dauben became chair of the executive committee of the ICHM in 1985 and proceeded to assemble the global contributions from 40 historians for the 2002 publication Writing the History of Mathematics: Its Historical Development, published by Birkhäuser. In his review, Donald Cook noted, "Because the book is not designed to completely explore issues, it may raise questions for readers."

The ICHM began awarding the Montucla Prize, for the best article by an early career scholar in Historia Mathematica, in 2009. The award is given every four years.
