= Joseph Dauben =

American historian (born 1944)

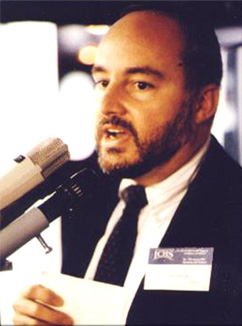
- Born: Joseph Warren Dauben; December 29, 1944 (age 81); Santa Monica, California, U.S.
- Education: Harvard University (PhD)
- Occupation: Historian

Joseph Warren Dauben (born December 29, 1944, Santa Monica) is a Distinguished Professor of History at Herbert H. Lehman College and the Graduate Center of the City University of New York. He obtained his PhD from Harvard University in 1972. His PhD thesis The early development of Cantorian Set Theory was supervised by Dirk Struik.

Dauben's fields of expertise are the history of science, the history of mathematics, the Scientific Revolution, the sociology of science, intellectual history, the 17th and 18th centuries, the history of Chinese science, and the history of botany.

== Positions ==
Dauben is a 1980 Guggenheim fellow.

He is a fellow of the American Association for the Advancement of Science, and a fellow of the New York Academy of Sciences (since 1982).

Dauben is an elected member (1991) of the International Academy of the History of Science and an elected foreign member (2001) of German Academy of Sciences Leopoldina.

In 1985–1994 Dauben served as the chair of the Executive Committee of the International Commission on the History of Mathematics.

Dauben delivered an invited lecture at the 1998 International Congress of Mathematicians in Berlin on Karl Marx's mathematical work.

The creator of non-standard analysis, Abraham Robinson was the subject of Dauben's 1995 book Abraham Robinson. It was reviewed positively by Moshé Machover, but the review noted that it avoids discussing any of Robinson's negative aspects, and "in this respect [the book] borders on the hagiographic, painting a portrait without warts."

In 2002 Dauben became an honorary member of the Institute for History of Natural Science of the Chinese Academy of Sciences. In 2012 he received the Albert Leon Whiteman Memorial Prize of the American Mathematical Society (AMS).

== Publications ==
- 1979: Georg Cantor, His Mathematics and Philosophy of the Infinite, Harvard University Press, LCCN 77-23435 ISBN 0674348710
  - pbk reprint. Princeton University Press. 1990. ISBN 0-691-02447-2.
- 1995: Abraham Robinson, The Creation of Nonstandard Analysis: A Personal and Mathematical Odyssey, Princeton University Press, LCCN 94-32715

== Articles, reviews, and essays ==
- 1985: "Abraham Robinson and Nonstandard Analysis: History, Philosophy, and Foundations of Mathematics", in William Aspray and Philip Kitcher, eds. History and Philosophy of Modern Mathematics, pages 177–200, Minnesota Studies in Philososphy of Science XI, University of Minnesota Press, 1988. Online here.
- 1991: "La Matematica," in W. Shea editor, Storia delle Scienze. LeScienze Fisiche e Astronomiche (Milano: Banca Popolare di Milano, and Einaudi, 1992) pp. 258–280
- 1992: "Are There Revolutions in Mathematics?" in The Space of Mathematics (editors J. Echieverria, A. Ibarra and T. Mormann) (Berlin: De Gruyter), pp. 203–226.
- 1992: "Conceptual Revolutions and the History of Mathematics: Two Studies in the Growth of Knowledge", Chapter 4 of D. Gillies, editor, Revolutions in Mathematics, Clarendon Press pp. 49–71.
- 1992: "Revolutions Revisited", Chapter 5 of D. Gillies, editor, Revolutions in Mathematics (Oxford: Clarendon Press), pp. 72–82.
- 2008: "Suan shu shu. A book on numbers and computations", translated from the Chinese and with commentary by Joseph W. Dauben. Archive for History of Exact Sciences 62(2): 91–178.
- 2015: with Marjorie Senechal, Dauben, Joseph; Senechal, Marjorie (2015). "Math at the Met". The Mathematical Intelligencer. 37 (3): 41–54. doi:10.1007/s00283-015-9571-8.

== See also ==
- Criticism of non-standard analysis
