= Herbert Mehrtens =

German historian of mathematician

- Born: 5 May 1946; Bremen
- Died: 27 May 2021 (aged 75); Berlin
- Education: University of Hamburg
- Known for: History of lattice theory; Social history of mathematics; Mathematical modernity; History of mathematics in Nazi Germany
- Partner: Silke Wenk
- Scientific career
- Fields: History of mathematics; Historiography of mathematics
- Workplaces: Technische Universität Berlin, TU Braunschweig
- Thesis: Die Entstehung der Verbandstheorie (The emergence of lattice theory) (1977)
- Doctoral advisor: Christoph Scriba

Herbert Mehrtens (5 May 1946 – 27 May 2021) was a German historian and historiographer of mathematics. Mehrtens is notable for his work in the history of lattice theory, and as an early researcher in the social history of mathematics, mathematical modernity, and the history of mathematics in Nazi Germany. Mehrtens' work in the history of mathematics "has had considerable, indeed field-changing impact."

== Life ==
Mehrtens was born on 5 May 1946 in Bremen. After graduating from high school in 1966, he did his basic military service in Oldenburg from 1966-1968, and then studied mathematics, philosophy, and the history of science at the University of Hamburg graduating in 1974. He went on to take his doctorate under Christoph Scriba in 1977 with a dissertation on the history of lattice theory (published 1979). From 1977 to 1982 he was a research assistant at Technische Universität Berlin, subsequently holding several positions there, interspersed with "scientifically productive unemployment, fellowships", and the like. He received his habilitation from TU Berlin with the study Moderne—Sprache—Mathematik. Eine Geschichte des Streits um die Grundlagen der Disziplin und des Subjekts formaler Systeme (Modernity—Language—Mathematics. A history of the controversy over the foundations of the discipline and the subject of formal systems) which was published in 1990. In 1992 he became Professor of Modern History (History of Science and Technology) at TU Braunschweig, retiring in 2011.

After Mehrtens became chairperson of the DGGMNT (German Society for the History of Medicine, Natural Science and Technology) in 2001 he strived to achieve its reunification with the Gesellschaft für Wissenschaftsgeschichte (Society for the History of Science [GWG]) which had split off in 1965. As a first step Mehrtens organised a joint meeting of DGGMNT and GWG at TU Braunschweig in 2006. The unification of the two societies under the umbrella Society for the History of Science, Medicine and Technology (GWMT) was achieved in 2017 after Mehrtens had retired.

In his later years Mehrtens shifted his focus away from the history of mathematics and worked collaboratively with his life partner the art historian Silke Wenk in the area of science policy journalism. Mehrtens died on 27 May 2021 in Berlin.

The December 2022 issue of the journal Science in Context was entitled Modernism in science and mathematics: A second look at Herbert Mehrtens and contained eight papers discussing the work and legacy of Mehrtens. The introduction stated "the contributors revisit key aspects of Mehrtens' oeuvre to reflect on its influence on the course of the historiography of mathematics and science from the mid-1970s onwards, and to consider its connection to the present priorities of these disciplines."

== Work ==
=== History of lattice theory ===
Mehrtens was awarded his doctorate in 1977 for the thesis Die Entstehung der Verbandstheorie (The emergence of lattice theory) which was published in 1979 and was generally well received. The book is divided into four chapters: 1. The development of the algebra of logic up to the concept of a lattice by Ernst Schröder, 2. Richard Dedekind's theory of "dual groups" (lattices) in the 1890s, 3. the rediscovery and reformulation of lattice theory around 1930, and 4. the establishment and growth of lattice theory in the 1930s.

Garrett Birkhoff, one of the pioneers of lattice theory in the 1930s, reviewed the book for Historia Mathematica and described it as "a thoughtfully written and thought-provoking account of the formation of lattice theory as a mathematical discipline". Birkhoff praised Mehrtens research methods, including the detailed questionnaires which he had sent to living mathematicians who had participated in the development of lattice theory. Birkhoff concluded "All considered, by its faithfulness to truth, recognition of the importance of personality, and imaginative use of original sources, Dr. Mehrtens' thorough yet humane book sets a style which could be followed to great advantage ... by other historians of mathematics trying to describe progress in other 20th-century mathematics."

Ivor Grattan-Guinness in Isis commented "In this excellent history Mehrtens shows himself to be a critical appraiser of lattice theory rather than its paladin ... Mehrtens's account of the nineteenth century progress of lattice theory is a valuable contribution at the interface of the histories of algebra, set theory, and logic." Grattan-Guinness noted the "clever use made by Mehrtens of the reminiscences that he obtained from prominent figures of the time who are still alive." He concluded "His blend of technical competence, social sense, and historical scholarship lends his book quite special qualities among recent publications in the field."

In 1994 Joseph Dauben commented: "This is all borne out in an exemplary fashion in Herbert Mehrtens' recent analysis of the origins and development of lattice theory. As Mehrtens shows, lattice theory arose in many different ways, as a result of diverse motives and different approaches. The eventual acceptance of lattice theory and its emergence as a recognized branch of mathematics in the 1930's was a social process, he says, as well as a matter of technical mathematics."

=== Social history of mathematics ===
From his earliest writings on the history of mathematics Mehrtens emphasized the importance of the social aspect of the history of mathematics. He stated baldly that mathematics is not "a package of eternal, spiritual truths gradually unwrapping itself in the course of history" but rather that "mathematics is man-made; its vital basis is the social interaction of mathematicians in their scientific community." In his 1979 history of lattice theory the reviewers pointed out Mehrtens', then unusual, use of social factors in his historical research.

Together with Henk J. M. Bos and Ivo Schneider, Mehrtens edited the 1981 book Social History of Nineteenth Century Mathematics which was based on a workshop held in Berlin in 1979 and included 16 papers. The book included a statement of Mehrtens' own views on the social history of mathematics.

While the social practice of mathematics is determined by the nature of mathematics as a specific type of knowledge, the historical process of extension and change of mathematical knowledge is a social process inseparably embedded in the societal environment. An individual new idea in mathematics is brought forward as a 'knowledge claim'. This is an act of communication subject to specific social regulations. The evaluation of such a knowledge claim within the community of mathematicians again is a process of social interaction. It will depend the more on general ideas and norms concerning knowledge the more the innovation tends to leave well-worn paths. The inclusion of an innovation into the dogmatized body of taught mathematics, its dissemination into areas of application and other mathematical or scientific subdisciplines are social processes as well subject to regulations imposed by norms and institutions.

— Herbert Mehrtens, "Social History of Mathematics", Social History of Nineteenth Century Mathematics (1981)

The book, and Mehrtens' contribution, were widely reviewed. The reviewer for Studia Leibnitiana commented "Mehrtens provides a good overview of the current state of research on sociological interpretations of the history of mathematics." and commended Mehrtens' "in-depth knowledge" in compiling the select bibliography. The reviewers for The Mathematics Teacher recommended the book "Since it discusses a new field in mathematics, this text provides invaluable reference material for young scholars. In terms of diversity, the background of individual contributors to this book is highly suitable. The articles by themselves are professional with an ample amount of originality." In a review for Science the historian of mathematics Judith Grabiner praised the papers by Dirk Struik, Philip Enros, Thomas Hawkins, David Bloor, and Mehrtens' bibliography, but considered that the other papers suffered from a variety of flaws. In a review for Isis, historian of science Kathryn Olesko commented "In his concluding seminal article, Mehrtens notes that there is a lack of guidelines for looking at the history of any branch of knowledge as an interwoven cognitive and social practice."

Mehrtens' contributions to the social history of mathematics were reviewed by Reinhard Siegmund-Schultze, Joseph Dauben, and by Lukas M. Verburgt

=== Mathematical modernity ===
In 1990 Mehrtens published his most original and influential work entitled Moderne—Sprache—Mathematik (Modernity—Language—Mathematics: A history of the controversy over the foundations of the discipline and the subject of formal systems). The book was 640 pages in length and contained seven chapters. 1. Prelude: The work of Gauss, Dedekind, Riemann, Peano, and Lobachevsky leading up to modernity; 2. Hilbert, Cantor, Zermelo, and Hausdorff and the modernity (formalist) approach to mathematics centred around set theory; 3. Kronecker, Klein, Poincaré, Brouwer and the counter-modernity (intuitionist) approach; 4. The foundational crisis (Grundlagenkrise), computing machines, ideology of National Socialism (anti-modernity), and Bourbaki; 5. The social and institutional modernization of mathematics in Germany 1890–1914; 6. Discourse and language of mathematics: a linguistic and semiotic analysis of mathematics that provides the theoretical model intended as a guide to the historical interpretation of the previous chapters; 7. Applications of formalism in the modern era, e.g. artificial languages, Taylorism, art, biometrics, and mathematics and the language of the unconscious (Jacques Lacan).

In his introduction to the book Mehrtens described it in the following terms:

From a mathematical-historical viewpoint we give a novel interpretation of the so-called 'foundational crisis' of mathematics; this is not so much a crisis of foundations, but rather a radical reformulation of the concepts of truth, meaning, object and existence of mathematics. Our intention is not only to give a new interpretation of an important part of the history of mathematics, but also to contribute to a better understanding of modernity in its more general social-historical and cultural-historical aspects. [translated from the German]

— Herbert Mehrtens, "Moderne—Sprache—Mathematik" (1990)

Mehrtens argued that the modernization of mathematics took place in terms of a dialectical process between the modernists and the counter-modernists. The two approaches were not to be understood in terms of simple opposition, but as a genuine ambiguity inherent in the very idea of modernity. Both sides offered views that were contradictory and complementary, needing each other to fully express themselves in a way that reflected the wider cultural and social changes of modernization itself.

A Cultural History of Mathematics in the Nineteenth Century (2025) summarised Mehrtens' approach to modernism: "At the close of the nineteenth century ... the recasting of mathematics into an autonomous self-defining discourse had become pervasive, and this led to an epistemic breach that separated those who resisted from those who welcomed it. Herbert Mehrtens retrospectively made this the very cornerstone of his interpretation of mathematical modernism. "The new language of mathematics does not need to be ascertained by an external reality, because it ascertains itself through its own constant work". ... Whereas the "moderns", championed by David Hilbert, proclaimed logical consistency was the bedrock of mathematical truth, the "counter-moderns", including Felix Klein, Henri Poincaré and L. E. J. Brouwer, sought to anchor mathematical knowledge in intuition and the pre-linguistic activity of the mind."

Reviewers described the book as "provocative", "daring ... a book that has been received with a mixture of enthusiasm and criticism", "remarkable and demanding" ... "[an] immensely rich work" ... "a major contribution to the history of modern science", "somewhat unstructured, even inchoate, [and] also highly ambitious and original ... This is history of mathematics that matters for historians and humanists, and indeed for anyone interested in the (post)modern intellectual scene.", "a very ambitious historical reconstruction", "a history of a long running debate within the mathematical community over the foundations of its science: should mathematics be "modern" or "counter-modern," should it be constructed from a finite number of assumptions and axioms, or be "intuitive?" and "a bold attempt to understand the debates over the foundations of mathematics in the early twentieth century in terms of a power struggle over the rules of mathematical discourse within the (mostly German) mathematical community."

Specific criticisms of the book included:

- The assignment of Klein into the counter-modern grouping, and Mehrtens' discussion of Klein's eugenic pronouncements and Klein's analysis of the rhetoric of Deutsche Mathematik in the 1930s.
- The assignment of Poincaré into the counter-modern grouping has been challenged by Jeremy Gray and Ivor Grattan-Guinness.
- The supposed opposition between the modernist and counter-modernist positions, with a marked partiality by Mehrtens towards the modernist side, when in practice this incompatibility almost never occurred.
- Doubts whether Mehrtens' bipolar modernist/counter-modernist theory is sufficient to explain the complexities in the development of early 20th-century mathematics.
- The limitation to the history of German-speaking mathematics, and the meta-mathematical focus.

Later commentators acknowledged the legacy of Mehrtens' work on mathematical modernity.

- In 1996 Moritz Epple said: "Herbert Mehrtens opened the debate with his 1990 book Moderne—Sprache—Mathematik. Future contributions to the topic of modernity in mathematics and its possible end will have to be measured by this work, which confidently links a broad spectrum of mathematical historical research with themes from cultural-theoretical discourse from Foucault to Lacan." and, in summary, "Moderne—Sprache—Mathematik deserves a competent discussion that does justice to the extremely rich spectrum of questions addressed. To have transcended the narrow framework, which is oriented towards little more than the self-image of contemporary mathematics and in which far too large a part of the history of mathematics still operates, is not the book's least merit."
- In 1996 Roland Calinger commented: "Many readers will undoubtedly find Mehrtens's forays into psycho-sexual analyses of mathematical ideas far-fetched or his enthusiasm for semiotics problematic. Nevertheless, his book contains a wealth of new ideas that have not only generated considerable excitement (including agitation) among historians of mathematics but which also suggest promising avenues for future investigations."
- In 1996/97 David E. Rowe commented "By placing the mathematical issues that divided antagonists like Hilbert and L.E.J. Brouwer within a larger cultural and disciplinary context, Mehrtens offers a provocative new interpretation of the deeper issues at stake that galvanized the rival parties in the conflict." and "one of the most provocative and original contributions to the history of mathematics ... in recent decades."
- In 2008 Jeremy Gray published the book Plato's Ghost: the modernist transformation of mathematics in which he gave credit to Mehrtens for the first serious and detailed work in the field of mathematical modernity, and discussed at length the similarities and differences between his approach and Mehrtens'. Compared with Mehrtens, Gray's book has international coverage, expands the mathematical fields covered to geometry, algebra, and analysis (in addition to logic and foundations), examines the relationship of modernity with philosophy, and analyses mathematical language in the context of linguistics. Gray argued that modernism in the arts, rather than in politics, is the relevant context for understanding mathematical modernism. A 2013 essay review of Plato's Ghost by David E. Rowe contained much material comparing and contrasting it with Moderne—Sprache—Mathematik.
- In 2011 Amir Alexander commented: "The insularity of the field has been a source of much soul-searching among scholars in the history of mathematics ... In recent years some historians of mathematics have worked to remedy the situation by emulating developments in the history of science and making use of social and cultural approaches. Herbert Mehrtens's Moderne—Sprache—Mathematik traced the role of mathematics in the modernist movement"
- In 2022 David E. Rowe commented: "The recently published collection of essays in The Richness of the History and Philosophy of Mathematics (Chemla et al. 2023) reveal how the larger issues raised in M-S-M have continued to spawn further reflection up to the present day." Leo Corry's essay took a critical stance: "Mehrtens left many fundamental questions unanswered, and his argumentation was somewhat misleading. For one thing, the critical debate among "moderns" and "countermoderns" would appear to be, in Mehrtens' account, one that referred only to the external or meta-mathematical aspects, while being alien to questions of actual research programs, newly emerging mathematical results, techniques, or disciplines. In addition, the classification of mathematicians into these two camps, and the criteria of belonging to either of them, seems too coarse to stand the test of close historical scrutiny, and in the final account was too strongly circumscribed to the Göttingen mathematical culture. In this sense, Mehrtens' book, for all its virtues, falls short of giving a satisfactory account of "modern mathematics" as a "modernist" undertaking.

=== History of mathematics and science in Nazi Germany ===
Mehrtens began his work in the field of the history of mathematics and science in Nazi Germany in 1979/80 with detailed literature reviews. Mehrtens is known as the coeditor of an early, wide-ranging essay collection that pioneered German-speaking historians of science's investigations of mathematics, the natural sciences and technology in the Nazi period. Mehrtens faced considerable challenges in gaining access to Nazi era archives, which were key to his research, and were sometimes deliberately closed to him. He formed a working partnership with Reinhard Siegmund-Schultze, an East German historian, and they exchanged archival materials that were not accessible to each other before the fall of the Berlin Wall.

Mehrtens challenged the idea that mathematics, and science generally, were politically neutral during the Nazi era. He documented how German mathematicians and scientific institutions interacted with, and accommodated themselves to, the Nazi ideology. Among the key concepts that Mehrtens introduced were those of "irresponsible purity", "collaborative relations", and "self-mobilization" which highlighted different aspects of mathematicians' and scientists' active involvement in the Nazi regime's political projects.

- Irresponsible purity referred to the moral failure of scientists and mathematicians who claimed that their work was apolitical or purely objective during the Nazi regime. The concept challenged the apologists' claim that scientists practised basic, untainted science separate from ideology; such science was actually a form of irresponsibility that integrated researchers into the state's military and political projects.
- Collaborative relations (Kollaborationsverhältnisse), or "the collaboration of the elites", referred to the complex, symbiotic working relationship between scientists, mathematicians, and the Nazi regime. Mehrtens argued that scientific work under the Nazis was not a battle between fanatical Nazi ideologues and oppressed, anti-Nazi scientists. Instead, it was defined by scientists and the state actively working together to fulfil mutual goals.
- Finally, self-mobilization, or self-motivated elite collaboration, meant the collaboration of scientists with the key political projects of the regime – the racial "purification" of the German Volkskörper and the conquest of "living space" (Lebensraum) – were generally not imposed by the Nazi state, but instead were willingly supported by the scientists themselves. Their total engagement in weapons development, nuclear research, rocket science and other projects suggests, in Mehrtens' view, that those involved did not hold back their effort or expertise.

In summary, Mehrtens stated that, after the largely silent acceptance of the Nazis' dismissal of scholars and scientists of so-called "non-Aryan" descent, which he called the "fundamental compromise", German academics collaborated actively with the National Socialist regime in multiple ways and were not morally or politically "neutral" during the Nazi era."

In his work on Ludwig Bieberbach and so-called Deutsche Mathematik, Mehrtens showed, as other scholars had done for Deutsche Physik, that oft-cited ideological attacks on modernistic mathematics and physics in the Nazi era were not ordered from above, but were in fact efforts by scientists who had long opposed these trends to defeat them by political means. His argument was that so-called "basic" theoretical work and applied mathematics of high quality were both needed and actually employed to support Nazism's central political projects in the German war effort. Once the Nazis seized power, German Jews came under widespread attack and antisemitism became state policy, and thus acceptable. David E. Rowe commented: "Herbert Mehrtens' portrait of Bieberbach remains an impressive study of a mathematician who, more than perhaps any other, embodied the evils of Nazi Germany."

A reviewer of Moderne—Sprache—Mathematik described the actions of Bieberbach:

The long-standing and very deep professional division between "formalists" like David Hilbert and "intuitionists" like Luitzen Egbertus Jan Brouwer provided the German mathematician Ludwig Bieberbach with an opportunity to try to harness the politics and racist ideology of National Socialism to his professional ends. Bieberbach appears to have been a political opportunist. During the Weimar Republic he was considered a "good republican;" both his colleagues and his students were surprised in 1933 when he suddenly and publicly embraced National Socialism. Bieberbach combined the professional debate over types of mathematics with the National Socialist dogma of race-based culture. He developed a theory of "Aryan mathematics," whereby different "psychological types," i.e., races, produced different types of mathematics. This may have been a sincere belief, in contrast to his political opportunism, but "Aryan mathematics" most certainly would never have received such attention or political and professional support without the Third Reich. ... Mehrtens demonstrates how political discontinuity can interact with scientific continuity to influence a "pure" science.

Mehrtens also examined the collaboration of German mathematical institutions with the Nazi state (Gleichschaltung - the process of bringing organizations into line with Nazi ideology). The organizations studied were the Deutsche Mathematiker-Vereinigung (DMV - German Mathematicians Union), the Gesellschaft für Angewandte Mathematik und Mechanik (GAMM - Society for Applied Mathematics and Mechanics), and the Mathematischer Reichsverband (MR - Reich Mathematical Association).

The DMV gave the cold shoulder to Bieberbach's Deutsche Mathematik; "the DMV was an organization with an international membership; it need to make clear to the foreign members that the DMV was warding off any Nazification of mathematics in Bieberbach's style ... The autonomy [the ability to manage its own affairs] of the DMV was not disturbed, and in exchange it was made certain that the leadership of the DMV remained loyal to the state." Under the leadership of the key aviation researcher Ludwig Prandtl, who did not subordinate himself to the Nazis and avoided political entanglements, the GAMM also managed to retain its autonomy. The leader of the MR, Georg Hamel, attempted to protect the interests of mathematicians by arguing for the teaching of Nazi ideologies such as Blut und Boden in schools.

Reinhard Siegmund-Schultze summarised Mehrtens contribution: "The theoretically most informed approach to the history of mathematics in Nazi Germany (and, incidentally, to the history of science as a whole) is that by Herbert Mehrtens ... On the social level he considers, partly inspired by P. Bourdieu, mathematics as a system that exchanges knowledge products plus political loyalty in return for material resources plus social legitimacy."

=== Historiography of mathematics ===
Mehrtens was an early researcher on the applicability of Thomas Kuhn's theory of Paradigm shifts (scientific revolutions) in the field of mathematics; his paper was partially a response to the paper Ten "Laws" concerning patterns of change in the history of mathematics published by Michael J. Crowe in 1975 in which Crowe had stated that revolutions did not occur in mathematics. Mehrtens took issue with Crowe's use of the preposition in as tending to support mathematicians' own definition of what mathematics is and what it is not. As Mehrtens says "There is a danger for the historian of mathematics in this preposition in".

Mehrtens' paper was republished in the book Revolutions in Mathematics (as was Crowe's) with a new appendix entitled Revolutions reconsidered in which he commented that the "debate on the relative importance of 'internal' and 'external' factors in the development of science has faded away ... the history of mathematics, however, appears to be somewhat behind the trend." Mehrtens goes on to say "I hear once in a while from historians of mathematics, that their field is too isolated from and too little recognized by colleagues in the history of natural sciences, marks a problem, not of the inaccessibility of mathematics, but rather of the inability of its historians to relate to issues of interest in general history of science." Mehrtens concluded by arguing that: "history of mathematics is an integral part of intellectual history."

In 2022 Mitchell Ash wrote a paper summarizing Mehrtens' achievements in the history and historiography of mathematics and their implications for future research in the areas of mathematical modernity, technocratic modernity, and the history of mathematics and science in Nazi Germany. Ash concluded "In the broadest sense, this paper can and should be understood as a plea for a culturally relevant and politically engaged historiography of the sciences and humanities. That is surely what Herbert Mehrtens also sought to achieve."

== Publications ==
Selected publications in the fields of the history of mathematics and the history of science.

=== Books ===
- 1979: Die Entstehung der Verbandstheorie (The emergence of lattice theory) (published version of 1977 doctoral thesis) (reviews)
- 1980: Naturwissenschaft, Technik und NS-Ideologie : Beiträge zur Wissenschaftsgeschichte des Dritten Reichs (Natural Science, Technology and Nazi Ideology: Contributions to the History of Science in the Third Reich) (co-editor) (reviews)
- 1981: Social History of Nineteenth Century Mathematics (co-editor) (reviews)
- 1990: Moderne—Sprache—Mathematik. Eine Geschichte des Streits um die Grundlagen der Disziplin und des Subjekts formaler Systeme (Modernity—Language—Mathematics. A history of the controversy over the foundations of the discipline and the subject of formal systems) (published version of habilitation thesis) (reviews)

=== Papers ===
- 1976: T. S. Kuhn's theories and mathematics: A discussion paper on the "new historiography" of mathematics (reprinted with an appendix) (review)
- 1977: The interactions of mathematics and society in history some exploratory remarks (co-author with Henk J. M. Bos)
- 1979: Die Naturwissenschaften im Nationalsozialismus (The natural sciences in National Socialism)
- 1980: Das "Dritte Reich" in der Naturwissenschaftsgeschichte: Literaturbericht und Problemskizz (The "Third Reich" in the history of science: literature review and problem outline)
- 1980: Felix Hausdorff, ein Mathematiker seiner Zeit (Felix Hausdorff, a mathematician of his time) (reviews)
- 1981: Social History of Mathematics
- 1981: Mathematicians in Germany circa 1800
- 1982: Richard Dedekind - Der Mensch und die Zahlen (Richard Dedekind - the man and the numbers)
- 1984: Anschauungswelt versus Papierwelt: Zur historischen Interpretation der Grundlagenkrise der Mathematik (Intuitive world versus paper world: On the historical interpretation of the fundamental crisis of mathematics)
- 1985: Die "Gleichschaltung" der mathematischen Gesellschaften im nationalsozialistischen Deutschland (The "Gleichschaltung" of mathematical societies in National Socialist Germany) translated into English in 1989. (review)
- 1986: Angewandte Mathematik und Anwendungen der Mathematik im nationalsozialistischen Deutschland (Applied mathematics and applications of mathematics in National Socialist Germany)
- 1987: The Social System of Mathematics and National Socialism: A Survey (republished in 1993)
- 1987: Ludwig Bieberbach and "Deutsche Mathematik" (reviews)
- 1989: Mathematics in the Third Reich - resistance, adaptation and collaboration of a scientific discipline
- 1990: Der französische Stil und der deutsche Stil. Nationalismus, Nationalsozialismus und Mathematik, 1900-1940 (The French style and the German style. Nationalism, National Socialism and Mathematics, 1900-1940)
- 1992: Revolutions reconsidered
- 1993: Irresponsible purity: The political and moral structure of mathematical sciences in the National Socialist state
- 1994: Kollaborationsverhältnisse: Natur- und Technikwissenschaften im NS-Staat und ihre Historie (Collaboration relations: Natural and technical sciences in the Nazi state and their history)
- 1996: Mathematics and war: Germany, 1900-1945
- 1996: Modernism vs counter-modernism, nationalism vs internationalism: style and politics in mathematics 1900-1950 (reviews)
- 1998: Mathematik: Funktion – Sprache – Diskurs (Mathematics: Function – Language – Discourse)
- 2004: Mathematical Models
