= Euler Lecture =

The Euler Lecture (German: Euler-Vorlesung in Sanssouci) is a mathematics lecture given at an annual event at the University of Potsdam (Universität Potsdam). The event, initiated in 1993, is organized by the University of Potsdam Institute for Mathematics, the Humboldt University of Berlin Institute for Mathematics, and the Berlin Mathematical Society, with the assistance of several other organizations, including the Free University of Berlin Depart of Mathematics and Computer Science, the Technical University of Berlin Institute for Mathematics, the Zuse Institute Berlin (ZIB), and the German Mathematical Society (Deutsche Mathematiker-Vereinigung [DMV]). The mathematical lecturer is selected by a distinguished jury. The event also contains a historical lecture (Vortrag) and a musical program supporting the event.

The Euler Lecture is named in honor of Leonhard Euler, who spent the years from 1741 to 1766 in Berlin and during that time wrote approximately 380 works. Among other things, Euler worked for many years as director of the mathematics section at the Prussian Academy of Sciences and as a consultant at the court of Frederick the Great in Potsdam.

The Euler Lecture should not be confused with the Ulf von Euler Lecture, an annual lecture sponsored by the Karolinska Institute and named in honor of the Swedish physiologist Ulf von Euler (1905–1983).

== Euler Lecture ==
The organizers of the Euler Lecture maintain an archive of lectures starting in 1993.

Euler Lectures
Year	Lecturer	Lecture Title
2026	Jessica Fintzen	Representing number theoretic symmetries with linear algebra
2025	Nalini Anantharaman	From Quantum Chaos to Random Surfaces
2024	Alessio Figalli	Exploring Stability in Geometric and Functional Inequalities
2023	Avi Wigderson	The Value of Error in Proofs
2022	Wolfgang Lück	A Panorama of L^{2}-Invariants
2021	Fernando Codá Marques	Morse Theory for the Area
2019	Claire Voisin	Some Aspects of Algebraic Geometry
2018	Emmanuel Candès	Sailing Through Data: Discoveries and Mirages
2017	Alfio Quarteroni	Taking Mathematics to the Heart
2016	Yuri Manin	Time between real and imaginary: Big Bang and modular curves
2015	Cédric Villani	Of particles, stars, and eternity
2014	Martin Hairer	Taming infinities
2013	David Eisenbud	Syzygies from Cayley to Kontsevich and beyond
2012	Simon Brendle	Der Satz von Alexandrov in gekrümmten Räumen [The Theorem of Alexandrov in curved spaces]
2011	Timothy Gowers	The internet and new ways of doing mathematics
2010	Wendelin Werner	Zufall und Stabilität [Chance and Stability]
2009	Hendrik W. Lenstra	Modelling finite fields
2008	Michael J. Hopkins	How topologists count things
2007	Stefan Hildebrandt	Euler und die Analysis [Euler and the Analysis]
2006	Noga Alon	Graphs, Euler's theorem, Grothendieck's inequality and Szemerédi's regularity lemma
2005	Persi Diaconis	From order to chaos with a blink of an epsilon: phase transitions and Markov chains
2004	Ludwig Faddeev	The Clay Millennium Problem on quantum Yang-Mills theory
2003	David Mumford	Metrics in the space of "shapes": Computer vision meets Riemannian geometry
2002	Michael Atiyah	Polyhedra in geometry, physics and chemistry
2001	Wolfgang M. Schmidt	Diophantische Approximationen, Diophantische Gleichungen und linear rekurrierte Folgen [Diophantic approximations, Diophantic equations, and linearly recurred sequences]
2000	Thomas C. Hales	Cannonballs and honeycombs: The proof of the Kepler conjecture
1999	Don Zagier	Von Ramanujans falschen Thetafunktionen zu Quanteninvarianten [From Ramanujan's false Theta-functions to quantum invariants]
1998	Ingrid Daubechies	Surfing with wavelets
1997	Haïm Brézis	Singularities and quantization effects for the Ginzburg-Landau equation
1996	László Lovász	Graphs and their geometric representation
1995	Armand Borel	Zeta function at integers in analysis and topology
1994	Roger Penrose	The complex structure of the universe
1993	Raoul Bott	Invariants of manifolds

== Historical lecture ==
Historical lectures at the Euler Lecture
Year	Lecturer	Lecture Title
2023	Catherine Goldstein	Charles Hermite and the Berlin Mathematicians
2019	Christian Gilain	D'Alembert: Mathematics and the Enlightenment
2018	Peter Ullrich	Berlin 1828–1855: »von dem anderen Dirichletschen Prinzipe [...] datiert die Neuzeit in der Geschichte der Mathematik« [From the other Dirichlet principles [...] dates the modern era in the history of mathematics]
2017	Tinne Hoff Kjeldsen	From quadratic forms to general convex bodies and beyond: Minkowskian "inventive art" and mathematical programming
2016	Tilman Sauer	»Ich bewundere die Eleganz Ihrer Rechnungsweise« – Einstein und die Mathematik ["I admire the elegance of your calculation" – Einstein and Mathematics]
2015	Horst Bredekamp	Die Zeichnung als Denkform: Leibniz und Peirce [Drawing as a form of thought: Leibniz and Peirce]
2014	Volker Remmert	»Ich lebe ja in der Tat ganz in Ihrer schönen Wissenschaft« – Mathematisches Publizieren in Deutschland (c. 1890 – 1930) ["I live in fact entirely in your beautiful science" – Mathematical Publishing in Germany]
2013	Heinrich Wefelscheid	»Er war der Pflichtbewußteste von uns allen« – Edmund Landau in Berlin und Göttingen ["He was the most duty-conscious of us all" – Edmund Landau in Berlin and Göttingen]
2012	Volker Remmert	Gartenkunst und die mathematischen Wissenschaften [Garden Art and the Mathematical Sciences]
2011	Reinhard Siegmund-Schultze	Schur und Landau: eine Freundschaft in unmenschlicher Zeit [Schur and Landau: a Friendship in Inhumane Times]
2010	Hans Föllmer	Von Berlin nach Paris und Housseras: Wolfgang Döblin (1915–1940) und die versiegelte Formel [From Berlin to Paris and Housseras: Wolfgang Döblin (1915–1940) and the sealed formula]
2009	Ehrhard Behrends	Euler und die Musik – wie kann man Wohlklang messen? [Euler and music - how can you measure harmony?]
2008	Erhard Scholz	Von den Anfängen des Zählens typologische Eigenschaften [From the beginnings of counting typological properties]
2007	Eberhard Knobloch	Leonhard Euler (1707–1783) – Zum 300. Geburtstag eines langjährigen Wahlberliners [For the 300th Birthday of a long-time Berliner]
2006	Raúl Rojas	1936 – annus mirabilis der Berechenbarkeitstheorie [1936 – annus mirabilis of the theory of reculability]
2005	Walter Purkert	Felix Hausdorff – Mathematiker, Philosoph und Literat [Felix Hausdorff – Mathematician, Philosopher and Writer]
2004	Andreas Verdun	Die Entstehung moderner wissenschaftlicher Methoden illustriert an Arbeiten von Leonhard Euler [The emergence of modern scientific methods, Illustrated by the works of Leonhard Euler]
2003	Henk Bos	Descartes' attempt to base certainty of geometry upon mental vision
2002	Moritz Epple	Knoten in der Mathematik und Physik des 19. Jahrhunderts [Nodes in mathematics and physics of the 19th century]
2001	Eberhard Knobloch	100 Jahre Mathematik in Berlin [100 years of mathematics in Berlin]
2000	Rudolf Wille	Eulers Speculum Musicum und das Instrument MUTABOR [Euler's Speculum Musicum and the instrument MUTABOR]
1999	Rüdiger Thiele	Er rechnete, wie andere atmen. Euler und der frühe Funktionsbegriff [He calculated how others breathe. Euler and the early concept of functions]
1998	Norbert Schappacher	Wer war Diophant? [Who was Diophantus?]
1997	Ivo Schneider	Parameter eines Mathematikerlebens zur Zeit von Euler [Parameters of a mathematical life at the time of Euler]
1996	Herbert Pieper	Die Eulersche Identität – eine Brücke zwischen Analysis, Arithmetik und Kombinatorik [The Eulerian identity – a bridge between analysis, arithmetic and combinatorics]
1995	Eberhard Knobloch	Das große Spargesetz der Natur: zur Tragikomödie zwischen Euler, Voltaire und Maupertuis [The great austerity law of nature: to the tragicomedy between Euler, Voltaire and Maupertuis]
1994	Hans-Christoph Im Hof	Geschichte und aktueller Stand der Euler-Ausgabe [History and current status of the Euler edition]
1993	Reinhard Bölling	Leonhard Euler – aus der Zeit seines Wirkens in Berlin [Leonhard Euler – from the time of his work in Berlin]
