= General relativity priority dispute =

Debate about credit for general relativity

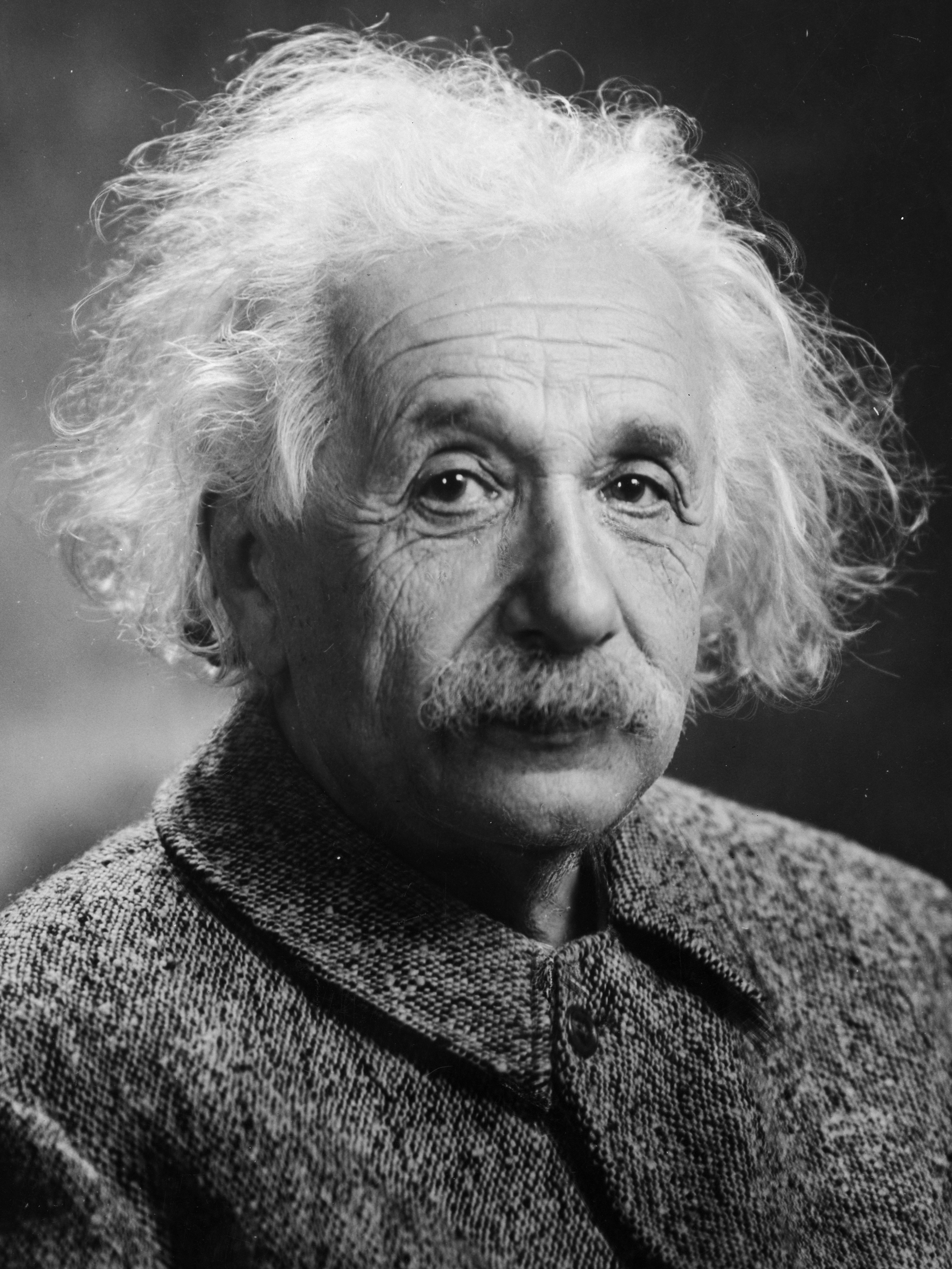
Albert Einstein

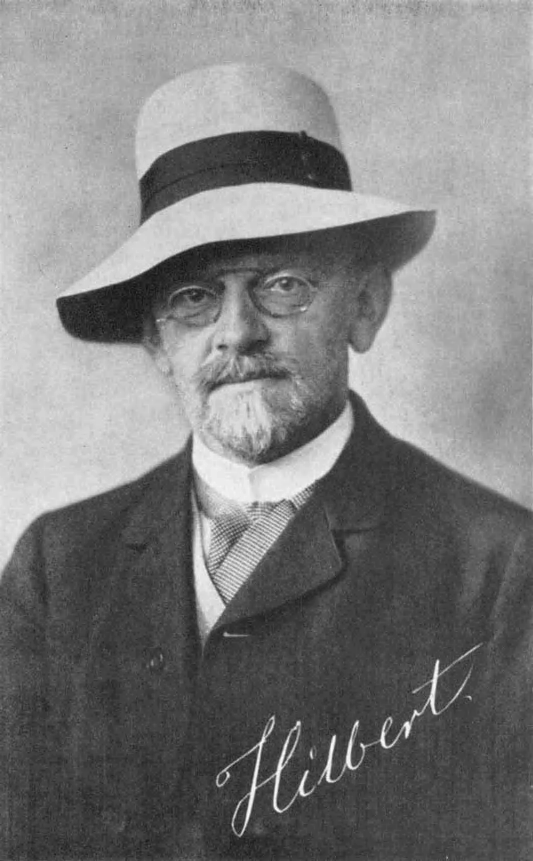
David Hilbert

Albert Einstein's discovery of the gravitational field equations of general relativity and David Hilbert's almost simultaneous derivation of the theory using an elegant variational principle, (Note: Whittaker, E. T. (1953) A History of the Theories of Aether and Electricity: Vol 2 The Modern Theories 1900-1926. Chapter V: Gravitation, Nelson, London.) during a period when the two corresponded frequently, has led to numerous historical analyses of their interaction. The analyses came to be called a priority dispute. (Note: Leo Corry, Jürgen Renn, John Stachel: "Belated Decision in the Hilbert-Einstein Priority Dispute", SCIENCE, Vol. 278, 14 November 1997 - article text)

== Einstein and Hilbert ==
The events of interest to historians of the dispute occurred in late 1915. At that time Albert Einstein, now perhaps the most famous modern scientist, had been working on gravitational theory since 1912. He had "developed and published much of the framework of general relativity, including the ideas that gravitational effects require a tensor theory, that these effects determine a non-Euclidean geometry, that this metric role of gravitation results in a redshift and in the bending of light passing near a massive body." While David Hilbert never became a celebrity, he was seen as a mathematician unequaled in his generation, with an especially wide impact on mathematics. When he met Einstein in the summer of 1915, Hilbert had started working on an axiomatic system for a unified field theory, combining the ideas of Gustav Mie's on electromagnetism with Einstein's general relativity. As the historians referenced below recount, Einstein and Hilbert corresponded extensively throughout the fall of 1915, culminating in lectures by both men in late November that were later published. The historians debate consequences of this friendly correspondence on the resulting publications.

== Undisputed facts ==
The following facts are well established and referable:

- The proposal to describe gravity by means of a pseudo-Riemannian metric was first made by Einstein and Marcel Grossmann in the so-called Entwurf theory published 1913. Grossmann identified the contracted Riemann tensor as the key for the solution of the problem posed by Einstein. This was followed by several attempts of Einstein to find valid field equations for this theory of gravity.
- David Hilbert invited Einstein to the University of Göttingen for a week to give six two-hour lectures on general relativity, which he did in June–July 1915. Einstein stayed at Hilbert's house during this visit. Hilbert started working on a combined theory of gravity and electromagnetism, and Einstein and Hilbert exchanged correspondence until November 1915. Einstein gave four lectures on his theory on 4, 11, 18 and 25 November in Berlin, published as [Ein15a], [Ein15b], [Ein15c], [Ein15d].
- 4 November: Einstein published non-covariant field equations and on 11 November returned to the field equations of the "Entwurf" papers, which he now made covariant by the assumption that the trace of the energy-momentum tensor was zero, as it was for electromagnetism.
- Einstein sent Hilbert proofs of his papers of 4 and 11 November. (Sauer 99, notes 63, 66)
- 15 November: Invitation issued for the 20 November meeting at the academy in Göttingen. "Hilbert legt vor in die Nachrichten: Grundgleichungen der Physik". (Sauer 99, note 73)
- 16 November: Hilbert spoke at the Göttingen Mathematical Society "Grundgleichungen der Physik" (Sauer 99, note 68). Talk not published.
- 18 November: Einstein replied a letter from Hilbert, saying as far as he (Einstein) could tell, Hilbert's system was equivalent to the one he (Einstein) had found in the preceding weeks. (Sauer 99, note 72). Einstein also told Hilbert in this letter that he (Einstein) had "considered the only possible generally covariant field equations three years earlier", adding that "The difficulty was not to find generally covariant equations for the $g^{\mu\nu}$; this is easy with the help of the Riemann tensor. What was difficult instead was to recognize that these equations form a generalization, and that is, a simple and natural generalization of Newton's law" (A. Einstein to D. Hilbert, 18 November, Einstein Archives Call No. 13-093). Einstein also told Hilbert in that letter that he (Einstein) had calculated the correct perihelion advance for Mercury, using covariant field equations based on the assumption that the trace of the energy momentum tensor vanished as it did for electromagnetism.
- 18 November: Einstein presented the calculation of the perihelion advance to Prussian Academy.
- 20 November: Hilbert lectured at the Göttingen Academy. The content of his presentation and of the proofs of the paper later published on the presentation are at the heart of the dispute among historians (see below).
- 25 November: In his last lecture, Einstein submitted the correct field equations. The published paper (Einstein 1915d) appeared on 2 December and did not mention Hilbert
- Hilbert starts his paper by citing Einstein: "The vast problems posed by Einstein as well as his ingeniously conceived methods of solution, and the far-reaching ideas and formation of novel concepts by means of which Mie constructs his electrodynamics, have opened new paths for the investigation into the foundations of physics."
- Hilbert's paper took considerably longer to appear. He had galley proofs that were marked "December 6" by the printer in December 1915. Most of the galley proofs have been preserved, but about a quarter of a page is missing. The extant part of the proofs contains Hilbert's action from which the field equations can be obtained by taking a variational derivative, and using the contracted Bianchi identity derived in theorem III of Hilbert's paper, though this was not done in the extant proofs.
- Hilbert rewrote his paper for publication (in March 1916), changing the treatment of the energy theorem, dropping a non-covariant gauge condition on the coordinates to produce a covariant theory, and adding a new credit to Einstein for introducing the gravitational potentials $g_{\mu\nu}$ into the theory of gravity. In the final paper, he said his differential equations seemed to agree with the "magnificent theory of general relativity established by Einstein in his later papers"
- Hilbert nominated Einstein for the third Bolyai prize in 1915 'for the high mathematical spirit behind all his achievements'
- The 1916 paper was rewritten and republished in 1924 [Hil24], where Hilbert wrote: Einstein [...] kehrt schließlich in seinen letzten Publikationen geradewegs zu den Gleichungen meiner Theorie zurück. (Einstein [...] in his most recent publications, returns directly to the equations of my theory.)

== Historians on Hilbert's point of view ==
Historians have discussed Hilbert's view of his interaction with Einstein.

Walter Isaacson points out that Hilbert's publication on his derivation of the equations of general relativity included the text: "The differential equations of gravitation that result are, as it seems to me, in agreement with the magnificent theory of general relativity established by Einstein."

Wuensch (Note: Daniela Wuensch, "zwei wirkliche Kerle", Neues zur Entdeckung der Gravitationsgleichungen der Allgemeinen Relativitätstheorie durch Einstein und Hilbert. Termessos, 2005, ISBN 3-938016-04-3) points out that Hilbert refers to the field equations of gravity as "meine Theorie" ("my theory") in his 6 February 1916 letter to Schwarzschild. This, however, is not at issue, since no one disputes that Hilbert had his own "theory", which Einstein criticized as naive and overly ambitious. Hilbert's theory was based on the work of Mie combined with Einstein's principle of general covariance, but applied to matter and electromagnetism as well as gravity.

Mehra (Note: Mehra, J. (1974) "Einstein, Hilbert, and the Theory of Gravitation" Reidel, Dordrecht, Netherlands.) and Bjerknes (Note: Bjerknes, Christopher Jon (2003), Anticipations of Einstein in the General Theory of Relativity, Downers Grove, Illinois: XTX Inc., ISBN 978-0-9719629-6-5 Author's site) point out that Hilbert's 1924 version of the article contained the sentence "... und andererseits auch Einstein, obwohl wiederholt von abweichenden und unter sich verschiedenen Ansätzen ausgehend, kehrt schließlich in seinen letzten Publikationen geradenwegs zu den Gleichungen meiner Theorie zurück" - "Einstein [...] in his last publications ultimately returns directly to the equations of my theory.". These statements of course do not have any particular bearing on the matter at issue. No one disputes that Hilbert had "his" theory, which was a very ambitious attempt to combine gravity with a theory of matter and electromagnetism along the lines of Mie's theory, and that his equations for gravitation agreed with those that Einstein presented beginning in Einstein's 25 November paper (which Hilbert refers to as Einstein's later papers to distinguish them from previous theories of Einstein). None of this bears on the precise origin of the trace term in the Einstein field equations (a feature of the equations that, while theoretically significant, does not have any effect on the vacuum equations, from which all the empirical tests proposed by Einstein were derived).

Sauer says "the independence of Einstein's discovery was never a point of dispute between Einstein and Hilbert ... Hilbert claimed priority for the introduction of the Riemann scalar into the action principle and the derivation of the field equations from it," (Sauer mentions a letter and a draft letter where Hilbert defends his priority for the action functional) "and Einstein admitted publicly that Hilbert (and Lorentz) had succeeded in giving the equations of general relativity a particularly lucid form by deriving them from a single variational principle". Sauer also stated, "And in a draft of a letter to Weyl, dated 22 April 1918, written after he had read the proofs of the first edition of Weyl's 'Raum-Zeit-Materie' Hilbert also objected to being slighted in Weyl's exposition. In this letter again 'in particular the use of the Riemannian curvature [scalar] in the Hamiltonian integral' ('insbesondere die Verwendung der Riemannschen Krümmung unter dem Hamiltonschen Integral') was claimed as one of his original contributions. SUB Cod. Ms. Hilbert 457/17."

== Did Einstein develop the field equations independently? ==
While Hilbert's paper was submitted five days earlier than Einstein's, it only appeared in 1916, after Einstein's field equations paper had appeared in print. For this reason, there was no good reason to suspect plagiarism on either side. In 1978, an 18 November 1915 letter from Einstein to Hilbert resurfaced, in which Einstein thanked Hilbert for sending an explanation of Hilbert's work. This was not unexpected to most scholars, who were well aware of the correspondence between Hilbert and Einstein that November, and who continued to hold the view expressed by Albrecht Fölsing in his Einstein biography:

In November, when Einstein was totally absorbed in his theory of gravitation, he essentially only corresponded with Hilbert, sending Hilbert his publications and, on November 18, thanking him for a draft of his article. Einstein must have received that article immediately before writing this letter. Could Einstein, casting his eye over Hilbert's paper, have discovered the term which was still lacking in his own equations, and thus 'nostrified' Hilbert? (Note: Fölsing, Albrecht: Einstein - a biography; Penguin (Non-Classics); New Ed edition (1 June 1998). ISBN 0-14-023719-4.)

In the very next sentence, after asking the rhetorical question, Folsing answers it with "This is not really probable...", and then goes on to explain in detail why.

[Einstein's] eventual derivation of the equations was a logical development of his earlier arguments—in which, despite all the mathematics, physical principles invariably predominated. His approach was thus quite different from Hilbert's, and Einstein's achievements can, therefore, surely be regarded as authentic.

In their 1997 Science paper, Corry, Renn and Stachel quote the above passage and comment that "the arguments by which Einstein is exculpated are rather weak, turning on his slowness in fully grasping Hilbert's mathematics", and so they attempted to find more definitive evidence of the relationship between the work of Hilbert and Einstein, basing their work largely on a recently discovered pre-print of Hilbert's paper. A discussion of the controversy around this paper is given below.

Those who contend that Einstein's paper was motivated by the information obtained from Hilbert have referred to the following sources:

- The correspondence between Hilbert and Einstein mentioned above. More recently, it became known that Einstein was also given notes of Hilbert's 16 November talk about his theory.
- Einstein's 18 November paper on the perihelion motion of Mercury, which still refers to the incomplete field equations of 4 and 11 November. (The perihelion motion depends only on the vacuum equations, which are unaffected by the trace term that was added to complete the field equations.) Reference to the final form of the equations appears only in a footnote added to the paper, indicating that Einstein had not known the final form of the equations on 18 November. This is not controversial, and is consistent with the well-known fact that Einstein did not complete the field equations (with the trace term) until 25 November.
- Letters of Hilbert, Einstein, and other scientists may be used in attempts to make guesses about the content of Hilbert's letter to Einstein, which is not preserved, or of Hilbert's lecture in Göttingen on 16 November.

Those who contend that Einstein's work takes priority over Hilbert's, or that both authors worked independently (Note: Todorov, Ivan T., Einstein and Hilbert: The Creation of General Relativity, Institut fuer Theoretische Physik Universitaet Goettingen, arXiv:physics/0504179v1, 25 April 2005.) have used the following arguments:

- Hilbert modified his paper in December 1915, and the 18 November version sent to Einstein did not contain the final form of the field equations. The extant part of the printer proofs does not have the explicit field equations. This is the point of view defended by Corry, Renn, Stachel, and Sauer.
- Sauer (1999) and Todorov (2005) agree with Corry, Renn and Satchel that Hilbert's proofs show that Hilbert had originally presented a non-covariant theory, which was dropped from the revised paper. Corry et al. quote from the proofs: "Since our mathematical theorem ... can provide only ten essentially independent equations for the 14 potentials [...] and further, maintaining general covariance makes quite impossible more than ten essential independent equations [...] then, in order to keep the deterministic characteristic of the fundamental equations of physics [...] four further non-covariant equations ... [are] unavoidable." (proofs, pages 3 and 4. Corry et al.) Hilbert derives these four extra equations and continues "these four differential equations [...] supplement the gravitational equations [...] to yield a system of 14 equations for the 14 potentials $g^{\mu\nu}$, $q_s$: the system of fundamental equations of physics". (proofs, page 7. Corry et al.). Hilbert's first theory (16 November lecture, 20 November lecture, 6 December proofs) was titled "The fundamental equations of Physics". In proposing non-covariant fundamental equations, based on the Ricci tensor but restricted in this way, Hilbert was following the causality requirement that Einstein and Grossmann had introduced in the Entwurf papers of 1913.
- One may attempt to reconstruct the way in which Einstein arrived at the field equations independently. This is, for instance, done in the paper of Logunov, Mestvirishvili and Petrov quoted below. (Note: Logunov, A. A (2004): "Henri Poincaré and Relativity Theory" - Phys. Usp. 47 (2004) 607-621; Usp. Fiz. Nauk 174 (2004) 663-678 - PraXis 2004 arXiv:physics/0405075) Renn and Sauer (Note: Jürgen Renn und Tilman Sauer (1996), "Einsteins Züricher Notizbuch: Die Entdeckung der Feldgleichungen der Gravitation im Jahre 1912", preprint 28 from Max Planck Institute - Web link. Publication date implied from web directory.) investigate the notebook used by Einstein in 1912 and claim he was close to the correct theory at that time.

== Scholars ==
This section cites notable publications where people have expressed a view on the issues outlined above.

=== Albrecht Fölsing on the Hilbert-Einstein interaction (1993) ===
From Fölsing's 1993 (English translation 1998) Einstein biography " Hilbert, like all his other colleagues, acknowledged Einstein as the sole creator of relativity theory."

=== Corry/Renn/Stachel and Friedwardt Winterberg (1997/2003) ===
In 1997, Corry, Renn and Stachel published a three-page article in Science entitled "Belated Decision in the Hilbert-Einstein Priority Dispute" concluding that Hilbert had not anticipated Einstein's equations. (Note: Jürgen Renn and John Stachel, Hilbert's Foundation of Physics: From a Theory of Everything to a Constituent of General Relativity - can be downloaded from link 118 in the preprint list at Max Planck Institute for the History of Science.)

Friedwardt Winterberg, (Note: Friedwart Winterberg: a critique of [Cor97] as printed in "Z.f. Naturforschung 59a" 59a, 715-719 (2004).) a professor of physics at the University of Nevada, Reno, disputed these conclusions, observing that the galley proofs of Hilbert's articles had been tampered with - part of one page had been cut off. He goes on to argue that the removed part of the article contained the equations that Einstein later published, and he wrote that "the cut off part of the proofs suggests a crude attempt by someone to falsify the historical record". Science declined to publish this; it was printed in revised form in Zeitschrift für Naturforschung, with a dateline of 5 June 2003. Winterberg criticized Corry, Renn and Statchel for having omitted the fact that part of Hilbert's proofs was cut off. Winterberg wrote that the correct field equations are still present on the existing pages of the proofs in various equivalent forms. In this paper, Winterberg asserted that Einstein sought the help of Hilbert and Klein to help him find the correct field equation, without mentioning the research of Fölsing (1997) and Sauer (1999), according to which Hilbert invited Einstein to Göttingen to give a week of lectures on general relativity in June 1915, which however does not necessarily contradict Winterberg. Hilbert at the time was looking for physics problems to solve.

A short reply to Winterberg's article can be found at; the original long reply can be accessed via the Internet Archive at . In this reply, Winterberg's hypothesis is called "paranoid" and "speculative". Corry et al. offer the following alternative speculation: "it is possible that Hilbert himself cropped off the top of p. 7 to include it with the three sheets he sent Klein, in order that they not end in mid-sentence." (Note: Corry, Renn Stachel: Short response to [Win02] - note: the original response was later replaced with a shorter one, and on 14 September 2006, this was replaced with a statement stating that the Max Planck Institute distances itself from Corry et al.'s statements about Winterberg. The original two versions are no longer available at this URL or at the Wayback Machine.)

As of September 2006, the Max Planck Institute of Berlin has replaced the short reply with a note saying that the Max Planck Society "distances itself from statements published on this website [...] concerning Prof. Friedwart Winterberg" and stating that "the Max Planck Society will not take a position in [this] scientific dispute".

Ivan Todorov, in a paper published on ArXiv, says of the debate:

Their [CRS's] attempt to support on this ground Einstein's accusation of "nostrification" goes much too far. A calm, non-confrontational reaction was soon provided by a thorough study of Hilbert's route to the "Foundations of Physics" (see also the relatively even handed survey (Viz 01)).

In the paper recommended by Todorov as calm and non-confrontational, Tilman Sauer concludes that the printer's proofs show conclusively that Einstein did not plagiarize Hilbert, stating

any possibility that Einstein took the clue for the final step toward his field equations from Hilbert's note [Nov 20, 1915] is now definitely precluded.

Max Born's letters to David Hilbert, quoted in Wuensch, are quoted by Todorov as evidence that Einstein's thinking towards general covariance was influenced by the competition with Hilbert.

Todorov ends his paper by stating:

Einstein and Hilbert had the moral strength and wisdom - after a month of intense competition, from which, in a final account, everybody (including science itself) profited - to avoid a lifelong priority dispute (something in which Leibniz and Newton failed). It would be a shame to subsequent generations of scientists and historians of science to try to undo their achievement.

=== Anatoly Alexeevich Logunov on general relativity (2004) ===
Anatoly Logunov (a former vice president of the Soviet Academy of Sciences and at the time the scientific advisor of the Institute for High Energy Physics), is author of a book about Poincaré's relativity theory and coauthor, with Mestvirishvili and Petrov, of an article rejecting the conclusions of the Corry/Renn/Stachel paper. They discuss both Einstein's and Hilbert's papers, claiming that Einstein and Hilbert arrived at the correct field equations independently. Specifically, they conclude that:

Their pathways were different but they led exactly to the same result. Nobody "nostrified" the other. So no "belated decision in the Einstein–Hilbert priority dispute", about which [Corry, Renn, and Stachel] wrote, can be taken. Moreover, the very Einstein–Hilbert dispute never took place.
All is absolutely clear: both authors made everything to immortalize their names in the title of the gravitational field equations. But general relativity is Einstein's theory. (Note: A.A. Logunov, M.A.Mestvirishvili, V.A. Petrov (2004): How Were the Hilbert-Einstein Equations Discovered? Phys. Usp. 47 (2004) 607-621; Usp.Fiz.Nauk 174 (2004) 663-678, arXiv:physics/0405075)

=== Wuensch and Sommer (2005) ===
Daniela Wuensch, a historian of science and a Hilbert and Kaluza expert, responded to Bjerknes, Winterberg and Logunov's criticisms of the Corry/Renn/Stachel paper in a book which appeared in 2005, where in she defends the view that the cut to Hilbert's printer proofs was made in recent times. Moreover, she presents a theory about what might have been on the missing part of the proofs, based upon her knowledge of Hilbert's papers and lectures.

She defends the view that knowledge of Hilbert's 16 November 1915 letter was crucial to Einstein's development of the field equations: Einstein arrived at the correct field equations only with Hilbert's help ("nach großer Anstrengung mit Hilfe Hilberts"), but nevertheless calls Einstein's reaction (his negative comments on Hilbert in the 26 November letter to Zangger) "understandable" ("Einsteins Reaktion ist verständlich") because Einstein had worked on the problem for a long time.

According to her publisher, Klaus Sommer, Wuensch concludes though that:

This comprehensive study concludes with a historical interpretation. It shows that while it is true that Hilbert must be seen as the one who first discovered the field equations, the general theory of relativity is indeed Einstein's achievement, whereas Hilbert developed a unified theory of gravitation and electromagnetism.

In 2006, Wuensch was invited to give a talk at the annual meeting of the German Physics Society (Deutsche Physikalische Gesellschaft) about her views about the priority issue for the field equations.

Wuensch's publisher, Klaus Sommer, in an article in Physik in unserer Zeit, (Note: Sommer, Klaus: "Wer entdeckte die Allgemeine Relativitätstheorie? Prioritätsstreit zwischen Hilbert und Einstein", Physik in unserer Zeit Volume 36, Issue 5, pp. 230–235. Published Online: 29 August 2005. Available online from Wiley InterScience (expect some problems; paid access to text only)) supported Wuensch's view that Einstein obtained some results not independently but from the information obtained from Hilbert's 16 November letter and from the notes of Hilbert's talk. While he does not call Einstein a plagiarist, Sommer speculates that Einstein's conciliatory 20 December letter was motivated by the fear that Hilbert might comment on Einstein's behaviour in the final version of his paper. Sommer claimed that a scandal caused by Hilbert could have done more damage to Einstein than any scandal before ("Ein Skandal Hilberts hätte ihm mehr geschadet als jeder andere zuvor").

=== David E. Rowe (2006) ===
The contentions of Wuensch and Sommer have been contested by the historian of mathematics and natural sciences David E. Rowe in a detailed review of Wuensch's book published in Historia Mathematica in 2006. Rowe argues that Wuensch's book offers nothing but tendentious, unsubstantiated, and in many cases highly implausible, speculations.

== In popular works by famous physicists ==
Wolfgang Pauli's Encyclopedia entry for the theory of relativity pointed out two reasons physicists did not consider Hilbert's derivation equivalent to Einstein's: 1) it required accepting the stationary-action principle as a physical axiom and more important 2) it was based on Mie unified field theory.

In his 1999 article for Time Magazine which featured Einstein Man of the Century Stephen Hawking wrote:

"Einstein had discussed his ideas with the mathematician David Hilbert during a visit to the University of Gottingen in the summer of 1915, and Hilbert independently found the same equations a few days before Einstein. Nevertheless, as Hilbert admitted, the credit for the new theory belonged to Einstein. It was his idea to relate gravity to the warping of space-time."

Kip Thorne concludes, in remarks based on Hilbert's 1924 paper, that Hilbert regarded the general theory of relativity as Einstein's:

"Quite naturally, and in accord with Hilbert's view of things, the resulting law of warpage was quickly given the name the Einstein field equation rather than being named after Hilbert. Hilbert had carried out the last few mathematical steps to its discovery independently and almost simultaneously with Einstein, but Einstein was responsible for essentially everything that preceded those steps...". (Note: Kip Thorne (1994): Black Holes and Time Warps: Einstein's Outrageous Legacy, W. W. Norton & Company; Reprint edition (January 1995). ISBN 0-393-31276-3)

However, Kip Thorne also stated, "Remarkably, Einstein was not the first to discover the correct form of the law of warpage [. . . .] Recognition for the first discovery must go to Hilbert" based on "the things he had learned from Einstein's summer visit to Göttingen." This last point is also mentioned by Corry et al.

== Insignificance of the dispute ==
As noted by the historians John Earman and Clark Glymour, "questions about the priority of discoveries are often among the least interesting and least important issues in the history of science." There was no real controversy between Einstein and Hilbert themselves:

"Of course, there never was any quarrel over priority between Hilbert and Einstein, who admired one another deeply."

And:

"Hilbert always remained aware of the fact that the great principal physical idea was Einstein's, and he expressed it in numerous lectures and memoirs ...."

== See also ==
- History of Lorentz transformations
- History of general relativity
- Criticism of relativity theory § Accusations of plagiarism and priority discussions
- List of scientific priority disputes
- Multiple discovery
