= Revolutions in Mathematics =

Book edited by Donald Gilles

- Editor: Donald Gillies
- Language: English
- Genre: Mathematics
- Publisher: Oxford Science Publications, The Clarendon Press, Oxford University Press
- Publication date: 1992

Revolutions in Mathematics is a 1992 collection of essays in the history and philosophy of mathematics.

== Contents ==
- Michael J. Crowe, Ten "laws" concerning patterns of change in the history of mathematics (1975) (15–20);
- Herbert Mehrtens, T. S. Kuhn's theories and mathematics: a discussion paper on the "new historiography" of mathematics (1976) (21–41);
- Herbert Mehrtens, Appendix (1992): revolutions reconsidered (42–48);
- Joseph Dauben, Conceptual revolutions and the history of mathematics: two studies in the growth of knowledge (1984) (49–71);
- Joseph Dauben, Appendix (1992): revolutions revisited (72–82);
- Paolo Mancosu, Descartes's Géométrie and revolutions in mathematics (83–116);
- Emily Grosholz, Was Leibniz a mathematical revolutionary? (117–133);
- Giulio Giorello, The "fine structure" of mathematical revolutions: metaphysics, legitimacy, and rigour. The case of the calculus from Newton to Berkeley and Maclaurin (134–168);
- Yu Xin Zheng, Non-Euclidean geometry and revolutions in mathematics (169–182);
- Luciano Boi, The "revolution" in the geometrical vision of space in the nineteenth century, and the hermeneutical epistemology of mathematics (183–208);
- Caroline Dunmore, Meta-level revolutions in mathematics (209–225);
- Jeremy Gray, The nineteenth-century revolution in mathematical ontology (226–248);
- Herbert Breger, A restoration that failed: Paul Finsler's theory of sets (249–264);
- Donald A. Gillies, The Fregean revolution in logic (265–305);
- Michael Crowe, Afterword (1992): a revolution in the historiography of mathematics? (306–316).

== Reviews ==
The book was reviewed by Pierre Kerszberg for Mathematical Reviews and by Michael S. Mahoney for American Mathematical Monthly. Mahoney says "The title should have a question mark." He sets the context by referring to paradigm shifts that characterize scientific revolutions as described by Thomas Kuhn in his book The Structure of Scientific Revolutions. According to Michael Crowe in chapter one, revolutions never occur in mathematics. Mahoney explains how mathematics grows upon itself and does not discard earlier gains in understanding with new ones, such as happens in biology, physics, or other sciences. A nuanced version of revolution in mathematics is described by Caroline Dunmore who sees change at the level of "meta-mathematical values of the community that define the telos and methods of the subject, and encapsulate general beliefs about its value." On the other hand, reaction to innovation in mathematics is noted, resulting in "clashes of intellectual and social values".

== Editions ==
- Gillies, Donald (1992) Revolutions in Mathematics, Oxford Science Publications, The Clarendon Press, Oxford University Press.
