= Donald A. Gillies =

British historian and philosopher

- Born: Donald Angus Gillies; 4 May 1944 (age 82)

Education
- Education: Cambridge University; London School of Economics
- Thesis: A critique of von Mises' theory of probability (1970)
- Doctoral advisor: Imre Lakatos
- Other advisor: Karl Popper

Philosophical work
- Era: Contemporary philosophy
- Region: Western philosophy
- School: Analytic
- Institutions: University College London
- Doctoral students: David Corfield
- Main interests: Philosophy of mathematics Philosophy of artificial intelligence
- Notable ideas: Non-Bayesian confirmation theory

Donald Angus Gillies (/ˈɡɪliːz/; born 4 May 1944) is a British philosopher and historian of science and mathematics. He is an Emeritus Professor in the Department of Science and Technology Studies at University College London.

== Career ==
After undergraduate studies in mathematics and philosophy at Cambridge, Gillies became a graduate student of Karl Popper and Imre Lakatos (his official PhD supervisor) at the London School of Economics, where he completed a PhD on the foundations of probability.

Gillies is a past President and a current Vice-President of British Society for the Philosophy of Science. From 1982 to 1985 he was an editor of the British Journal for the Philosophy of Science.

Gillies is probably best known for his work on Bayesian confirmation theory, his attempt to simplify and extend Popper’s theory of corroboration. He proposes a novel "principle of explanatory surplus", likening a successful theoretician to a successful entrepreneur. The entrepreneur generates a surplus (of income) over and above his initial investment (the outgoes) to meet the necessary expenses of the enterprise. Similarly, the theoretician generates a surplus (of explanations) over and above his initial investment (of assumptions) to make the necessary explanations of known facts. The size of this surplus is held to be a measure of the confirmation of the theory, but only in qualitative, rather than quantitative, terms.

Gillies has researched the philosophy of science, most particularly the foundations of probability; the philosophy of logic and mathematics; and the interactions of artificial intelligence with some aspects of philosophy, including probability, logic, causality and scientific method. In the philosophy of mathematics, he has developed a method of dealing with very large transfinite cardinals from an Aristotelian point of view.

== Books and articles (selection) ==
- Gillies, Donald and Chihara, Charles S. (1988). "An Interchange on the Popper-Miller Argument". Philosophical Studies, Volume 54, pp. 1–8.
- Gillies, Donald (1989). "Non-Bayesian Confirmation Theory and the Principle of Explanatory Surplus". The Philosophy of Science Association, PSA 1988, Volume 2, pp. 373–380.
- Gillies, Donald ed. (1992). Revolutions in Mathematics. Oxford Science Publications. The Clarendon Press, Oxford University Press, New York.
- Gillies, Donald (1996). "Artificial intelligence and scientific method". Oxford: Oxford University Press.
- Gillies, Donald (2000). Philosophical Theories of Probability. London: Routledge.
- Gillies, Donald (2010). An objective Theory of Probability. London: Routledge.
- Gillies, Donald (2011). Frege, Dedekind, and Peano on the Foundations of Arithmetic. London: Routledge.
