= Emily Grosholz =

American poet and philosopher (1950–2026)

Emily Rolfe Grosholz (October 17, 1950 – May 2, 2026) was an American poet and philosopher. She was the Edwin Erle Sparks Professor of Philosophy, African American Studies and English, and a member of the Center for Fundamental Theory / Institute for Gravitation and the Cosmos, at the Pennsylvania State University.

Grosholz was the 2011 Elizabeth McNulty Wilkinson '25 Poetry Chair, at Buffalo Seminary in March 2011.

From September 2011 through January 2012, she was a senior researcher at REHSEIS / SPHERE / CNRS and University of Paris Diderot - Paris 7, with a 'Research in Paris 2011' grant from the city of Paris.

== Life and career ==
Emily Rolfe Grosholz was born in Philadelphia, Pennsylvania, on October 17, 1950, and was raised in the suburbs of the city. She graduated from the University of Chicago, with a B.A. in 1972, and Yale University with a Ph.D. in Philosophy in 1978.

Grosholz was a 1988 Guggenheim Fellow. She held National Endowment for the Humanities fellowships in 1985 and in 2004, and American Council of Learned Societies fellowships in 1982 and 1997.

She served as an advisory editor for the Hudson Review from 1984. Grosholz was a member of the editorial board of the Journal of the History of Ideas from 1998, a member of the editorial board of Studia Leibnitiana from 2002, and a member of the editorial board of the Journal of Humanistic Mathematics from 2010. She was a member of the Directive Committee of the Association for the Philosophy of Mathematical Practice.

Grosholz was married to the medievalist Robert R. Edwards, with whom she had four children. She died at her home on May 2, 2026, at the age of 75.

== Works ==
=== Autobiography/Essay ===
- Great Circles, Springer, 2018, ISBN 978-3-319-98230-4 ISBN 978-3-319-98231-1 (eBook) doi:10.1007/978-3-319-98231-1 LCCN 2018-954226

=== Poetry ===
- The River Painter, University of Illinois Press, 1984, ISBN 978-0-252-01098-9
- Shores and Headlands, Princeton University Press, 1988, ISBN 978-0-691-06749-0
- Eden, Johns Hopkins University Press, 1992, ISBN 978-0-8018-4390-7
- The Abacus of Years. David R. Godine Publisher, Inc. 2001. ISBN 978-1-56792-155-7.
- Feuilles; Huit poèmes: Edition bilingue français-anglais, with Farhad Ostovani, William Blake And Co, 2009, ISBN 978-2-84103-165-8
- Beginning and End of the Snow, Bucknell University Press, 2012, ISBN 978-1-61148-458-8 (English Translation of Yves Bonnefoy Debut et fin de la Neige, Mercure de France; with drawings by Farhad Ostovani)
- Proportions of the Heart: Poems that Play with Mathematics, Tessellations Publishing, 2014, ISBN 978-1-938664-10-6 (with mathematical artwork by Robert Fathauer)
- Childhood, Accents Publishing, 2014, ISBN 978-1-936628-27-8 (with drawings by Lucy Vines), translated to Yoruba language in 2021 by Kola Tubosun
- The Stars of Earth: New and Selected Poems, Word Galaxy Press, 2017, ISBN 978-1-77349-001-4

=== Philosophy ===
- Cartesian Method and the Problem of Reduction (1991) Oxford University Press ISBN 978-0-19-824250-5
- Emily Grosholz & Elkanan Yakira (1998). Leibniz's science of the rational. Franz Steiner Verlag. ISBN 978-3-515-07400-1.
- Representation and Productive Ambiguity in Mathematics and the Sciences, Oxford University Press, 2007, ISBN 978-0-19-929973-7
- "The Humanism of Ernst Cassirer", Hudson Review
- Starry Reckoning: Reference and Analysis in Mathematics and Cosmology (2016) Springer Verlag, SAPERE. In Studies in Applied Philosophy, Epistemology and Rational Ethics Series (edited by Lorenzo Magnani).
- "Was Leibniz a mathematical revolutionary?", pages 117 to 133 of Revolutions in Mathematics (1992) Gillies editor, Oxford University Press.

=== Editor ===
- Emily Grosholz, James Stewart and Bernard Bell (Eds), W. E. B. Du Bois on Race and Culture, Routledge, 1996, ISBN 0-415-91556-2
- Emily Grosholz (Ed), Telling the Barn Swallow: Poets on the Poetry of Maxine Kumin, University Press of New England, 1997, ISBN 978-0-87451-784-2
- Emily Grosholz and Herbert Breger (Eds), The Growth of Mathematical Knowledge, Kluwer, 1999, ISBN 0-7923-6151-2
- Emily Grosholz (Ed), The Legacy of Simone de Beauvoir, Oxford University Press, 2004 / 2008, ISBN 0-19-926535-6
- Emily Grosholz, Carlo Cellucci and Emiliano Ippoliti (Eds), Logic and Knowledge, Cambridge Scholars Publishing, 2011, ISBN 978-1-4438-3008-9
- Emily Grosholz (Ed), Studia Leibnitiana, Band 44, Heft 1 (2012), Franz Steiner Verlag, ISSN 0039-3185 (Special issue on Leibniz, Time and History)
