= Tilman Sauer =

German physicist and historian

Tilman Sauer (born 1963) is a German theoretical physicist and historian of the natural sciences. He has an international reputation as an expert on the history of the development of general relativity theory.

== Education and career ==
At the Free University of Berlin, Sauer received in 1990 his Diplom in theoretical physics and in 1994 his doctorate (Promotion) in theoretical physics. His doctoral dissertation is entitled Development and Application of Refined Path Monte Carlo Methods. From 1991 to 1996 he was employed as a research scholar at Berlin's Max Planck Institute for Human Development. In 1996 from March to December he worked at Berlin's Max Planck Institute for the History of Science. From 1997 to 1999 he worked for the project Hilbert-Edition at the University of Göttingen's Institute for the History of Science. From 1999 to 2001 he was an assistant professor (Hochschulassistent) at the University of Bern's Institute for the History of Science, where he eventually completed his habilitation in the history of science in 2008. From December 2008 to September 2015 he was a Privatdozent at the University of Bern. Sauer has held various academic appointments in the history department at Caltech since 2001. For the academic year 2010–2011 at the University of Bern, he held an interim chair (Lehrstuhlvertretung) for the history and philosophy of science. At the University of Mainz, he has been, since 2015, a professor for the history of mathematics and natural sciences.

Sauer has done much research on the history of general relativity (GR) in the scientific work of Albert Einstein and co-edited for the Einstein Papers Project volumes 9 through 14 and also volume 16. He was a contributing editor for volume 4. Specifically, he edited the scientific manuscripts on GR and unified field theory. With Jürgen Renn, Sauer investigated and published Einstein's 1912 Zurich notebook, which is important for the history of the emergence of GR.

Einstein seems to have delayed until 1936 publishing an important idea he had in 1912. Renn and Sauer explicated the role that Rudi W. Mandl played in urging Einstein to publish on gravitational lensing.

Sauer also researched David Hilbert's contributions to the early history of GR and the Hilbert-Einstein priority dispute and Hilbert's program on the foundations of physics. The priority dispute is, among other things, about the question of what is written on a missing page of a page proof of Hilbert's paper — Sauer is of the opinion that the complete Einstein field equations were not found by Hilbert.

Sauer's research also includes, among other topics, the history of Richard Feynman's research and the development of the theory of path integrals.

In 2016 Sauer gave the historical lecture „Ich bewundere die Eleganz Ihrer Rechnungsweise“ - Einstein und die Mathematik (I admire the elegance of your calculations — Einstein and mathematics), which was part of the events accompanying the Euler Lecture.

== Selected publications ==
=== Articles ===
- Renn, J.; Sauer, T. (September 1996). "Einsteins Züricher Notizbuch: Die Entdeckung der Feldgleichungen der Gravitation im Jahre 1912". Physikalische Blätter. 52 (9): 865–872. doi:10.1002/phbl.19960520907. hdl:11858/00-001M-0000-002A-9BA1-0.
  - Einsteins Züricher Notizbuch, Preprint MPI Wissenschaftsgeschichte, Berlin
- Sauer, Tilman (November 2006). "Field equations in teleparallel space–time: Einstein's Fernparallelismus approach toward unified field theory". Historia Mathematica. 33 (4): 399–439. arXiv:physics/0405142. doi:10.1016/j.hm.2005.11.005.

=== Book chapters ===
- Hubert Goenner; Jürgen Renn; Jim Ritter; Tilman Sauer, eds. (1998). The expanding worlds of general relativity. Einstein Studies, volume 7. Springer Science & Business Media. ISBN 0-8176-4060-6.
  - Chapter. Heuristics and Mathematical Representation in Einstein's Search for a Gravitational Field Equation by Jürgen Renn and Tilman Sauer, pages 87–126
- rederic Lawrence Holmes; Jürgen Renn; Hans-Jörg Rheinberger, eds. (2003). Reworking the bench. Research notebooks in the history of science. Archimedes, Volume 7, New Studies in the History and Philosophy of Science and Technology. Kluwer. pp. 253–268. ISBN 1-4020-1039-7.
  - Chapter. Errors and insights: reconstructing the genesis of general relativity from Einstein's Zürich notebook by Jürgen Renn and Tilman Sauer, pages 253–268
- Ivor Grattan-Guinness, ed. (2005). Landmark Writings 1640–1940. Elsevier. ISBN 0-444-50871-6.
  - Book Chapter. Albert Einstein's 1916 Review Article on General Relativity by Tilman Sauer, pages 802–822. arXiv preprint
- Jürgen Renn, ed. (2007). The Genesis of General Relativity. Boston Studies in the Philosophy of Science. Vol. 1. Dordrecht: Springer.; Renn, Jürgen (16 February 2007). The Genesis of General Relativity: Sources and Interpretations. Springer. ISBN 9781402039997. LCCN 2007440325. table of contents
  - Chapter. Einstein's Zürich Notebook. Introduction and Source. Introduction to Volumes 1 and 2: The Zurich Notebook and the Genesis of General Relativity by Michel Janssen, John D. Norton, Jürgen Renn, Tilman Sauer, and John Stachel, pages 7–20
  - Chapter. Pathways Out of Classical Physics: Einstein's Double Strategy in his Search for the Gravitational Field Equation by Jürgen Renn and Tilman Sauer, pages 113–312
- Jürgen Renn (ed.). The Genesis of General Relativity. Boston Studies in the Philosophy of Science. Vol. 2. Springer.; table of contents
  - Chapter. A Commentary on the Notes on Gravity in the Zurich Notebook by Michel Janssen, Jürgen Renn, Tilman Sauer, John D. Norton, and John Stachel, pages 489–714

=== Books ===
- Renn, J.; Sauer, T. (1995). "Einsteins Züricher Notizbuch: die Entdeckung der Feldgleichungen der Gravitation im Jahre 1912". Physikalische Blätter. 52 (9). Berlin: Max-Planck-Institut für Wissenschaftsgeschichte: 865–872. doi:10.1002/phbl.19960520907. hdl:11858/00-001M-0000-002A-7366-9.
- Hubert Goenner; Jürgen Renn; Jim Ritter; Tilman Sauer, eds. (1998). The expanding worlds of general relativity. Einstein Studies, volume 7. Springer Science & Business Media. ISBN 0-8176-4060-6.
- Hilbert, David (2009). Tilman Sauer; Ulrich Majer; Arne Schirrmacher; Heinz-Jürgen Schmidt (eds.). David Hilbert's lectures on the foundations of physics, 1915-1927 : relativity, quantum theory and epistemology. Dordrecht; New York: Springer. ISBN 978-3-540-20606-4.
- Tilman Sauer; Raphael Scholl, eds. (2016). Philosophy of Historical Case Studies. Cham, Switzerland: Springer International Publishing. ISBN 978-3-319-30227-0.
- David E. Rowe; Tilman Sauer; Scott A. Walter, eds. (2018). Beyond Einstein : Perspectives on Geometry, Gravitation, and Cosmology in the Twentieth Century. New York, NY: Springer New York. ISBN 978-1-4939-7706-2.
