= Ivo Schneider =

German mathematician

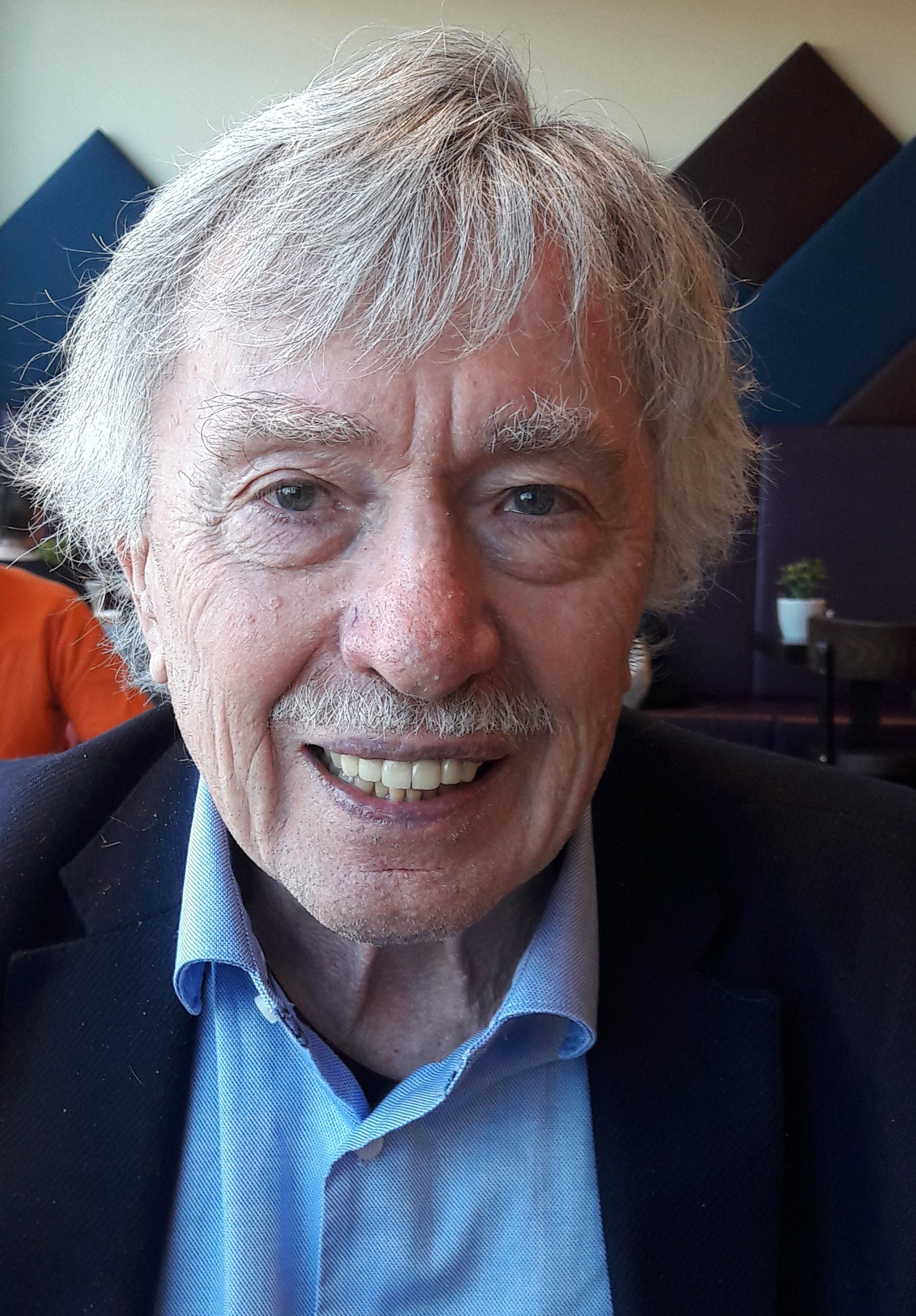
Ivo Schneider

Ivo Hans Schneider (born 1 September 1938 in Munich) is a German mathematician and historian of mathematics and the natural sciences.

== Biography ==
Schneider received his Abitur in 1957. He studied mathematics and physics at LMU Munich, where he graduated as a mathematician in 1963 and received his doctorate in 1968. His doctoral dissertation on Abraham de Moivre (Der Mathematiker Abraham de Moivre (1667–1754) was supervised by Helmuth Gericke and Karl Stein. In 1972, Schneider completed his habilitation Die Entwicklung des Wahrscheinlichkeitsbegriffs in der Mathematik von Pascal bis Laplace (The development of the concept of probability in mathematics from Pascal to Laplace). For the academic year 1972–1973, he was visiting professor, upon the invitation of Thomas S. Kuhn, at Princeton University and gave there a seminar on the history of probability theory. In the history of natural sciences department of LMU Munich, Schneider was an adjunct professor from 1978 to 1980 and a full professor from 1980 to 1995. At the University of the Bundeswehr Munich, he was a professor of the history of science from 1995 to 2003, when he retired as professor emeritus. From 1999 to 2000, he was a member of the University of the Bundeswehr Munich's academic senate.

In 1983, he was also a visiting professor at the Center for Interdisciplinary Research at Bielefeld University (as part of the project The probabilistic revolution 1800–1930). He was also a visiting professor in 1988 at the University of Minnesota, Minneapolis and in 1999 at the Budapest University of Technology and Economics. He taught in Stuttgart (1971), Salzburg (1982/83, 1988/89), and Klagenfurt (1985).

As a science historian, much of his work deals with the history of probability theory and its applications in physics. He has published on Rudolf Clausius, ancient Greek writings about Archimedes, applied mathematicians' use of measuring instruments, and philosophical influences on mathematicians.

He has been a corresponding member of the Académie Internationale d'Histoire des Sciences since 1984 and a member since 1995. From 1990 to 2006, he was a member of the board of trustees of Munich's German Museum. From 1997 to 2006, he was a member of the board of Munich's Zentrum für Wissenschafts- und Technikgeschichte (ZWTG, Center for the History of Science and Technology). From 1988 to 1998, he was spokesman for the graduate school Wechselbeziehungen zwischen Naturwissenschaften und Technik im deutschsprachigen Raum (Interrelationships between natural sciences and technology in German-speaking countries) at the Munich universities and the German Museum.

In December 1997 he married Angela Meier. They have a daughter Franziska.

== Honors ==
- In 1971 Schneider received the Rudolf-Kellermann-Preis (Rudolf Kellermann Prize) for the history of technology for his work Der Proportionalzirkel – ein Analogrecheninstrument der Vergangenheit (The proportional circle - an analogue computing instrument of the past), published by Oldenbourg in 1970.
- In 1997 Schneider gave the historical lecture Parameter eines Mathematikerlebens zur Zeit von Euler, which was part of the events accompanying the Euler Lecture.
- In 2004 he received an honorary doctorate from the Budapest University of Technology and Economics.
- In 2013 he was awarded the Order of Merit of the Federal Republic of Germany.

== Selected publications ==
=== Articles ===
- Schneider, Ivo (1976). "The introduction of probability into mathematics". Historia Mathematica. 3 (2): 135–140. doi:10.1016/0315-0860(76)90029-X.
- Dauben, Joseph W., ed. (1981). "Leibniz on the Probable by Ivo Schneider, dedicated to K.-R. Biermann on his 60th birthday; with assistance from M. Norton Wise in translating the paper from German into English". Mathematical Perspectives: Essays on Mathematics and its Historical Development. pp. 201–219. doi:10.1016/B978-0-12-204050-4.50016-3. ISBN 978-0-12-204050-4.
- Schneider, Ivo (2005). "Chapter 6 - Jakob Bernoulli, Ars conjectandi (1713)". Landmark Writings in Western Mathematics 1640-1940. pp. 88–104. doi:10.1016/B978-044450871-3/50087-5. ISBN 978-0-444-50871-3.
- Schneider, Ivo (2005). "Chapter 7 - Abraham de Moivre, the doctrine of chances (1718, 1738, 1756)". Landmark Writings in Western Mathematics 1640-1940. pp. 105–120. doi:10.1016/B978-044450871-3/50088-7. ISBN 978-0-444-50871-3.
- Heyde, C. C.; Crepel, P.; Fienberg, S. E.; Seneta, E.; Gani, J., eds. (December 2013). "Christiaan Huygens by Ivo Schneider". Statisticians of the Centuries. Springer. pp. 23–28. ISBN 978-1-4613-0179-0.

=== Books ===
- Schneider, Ivo (1970). Der Proportionalzirkel; ein universelles Analogrecheninstrument der Vergangenheit. München: R. Oldenbourg. LCCN 70852118.
- Schneider, Ivo (1979). Archimedes – Ingenieur, Naturwissenschaftler und Mathematiker. Erträge der Forschung. Darmstadt: Wissenschaftliche Buchgesellschaft. LCCN 79362574.
- Mehrtens, Herbert; Bos, Henk; Schneider, Ivo, eds. (6 December 2012). Social History of Nineteenth Century Mathematics. Springer. ISBN 978-1-4684-9491-4. (1st edition 1981)
- Schneider, Ivo, ed. (1981). Carl Friedrich Gauss - Sammelband von Beiträgen zum 200. Geburtstag von Carl Friedrich Gauss. Minerva. ISBN 3597102808.
- Schneider, Ivo (1988). Entwicklung der Wahrscheinlichkeitsrechnung von den Anfängen bis 1933. Einführung und Texte. Wissenschaftliche Buchgesellschaft. ISBN 3534087593. LCCN 89153990.
- Schneider, Ivo (1988). Isaac Newton. Beck’sche Reihe Große Denker. Beck. ISBN 3406332129. LCCN 88210954.
- Schneider, Ivo (1993). Johannes Faulhaber 1580–1635. doi:10.1007/978-3-0348-7274-4. ISBN 978-3-0348-7275-1.
- Schneider, Ivo; Trischler, Helmuth; Wengenroth, Ulrich (2000). Oszillationen: Naturwissenschaftler und Ingenieure zwischen Forschung und Markt. Oldenbourg. ISBN 978-3-486-29002-8.
