= Sabetai Unguru =

Israeli historian of mathematics and science (1931–2024)

- שבתאי אונגורו
- Born: 1 January 1931; Podu Iloaiei, Romania
- Died: 6 January 2024 (aged 93)
- Spouse: Yocheved Unguru

Academic background
- Education: University of Iași; University of Wisconsin–Madison

Academic work
- Discipline: History of science
- Sub-discipline: Ancient and medieval mathematics, optics, natural philosophy
- Institutions: Tel Aviv University
- Doctoral students: Leo Corry

Sabetai Unguru (Hebrew: שבתאי אונגורו, Shabtai Unguru; 1 January 1931 – 6 January 2024) was an Israeli historian of mathematics and science.

== Biography ==
Sabetai Unguru was born in 1931 in Podu Iloaiei, Romania. He studied philosophy, philology, history, and mathematics at the University of Iași before immigrating to Israel in 1961. He obtained his Ph.D. in the history of science from the University of Wisconsin–Madison in 1970, and was an assistant and associate professor in the Department of History at the University of Oklahoma between 1970 and 1982.

Unguru was appointed associate professor at Tel Aviv University in 1983, and became full professor in 1987. He served as the Director of the Cohn Institute for the History and Philosophy of Science and Ideas at Tel Aviv University from 1991 to 1997.

Unguru died on 6 January 2024, at the age of 93.

== Selected works ==
=== Books ===
- Fried, Michael N.; Unguru, Sabetai (2001). Apollonius of Perga's Conica: Text, Context, Subtext. Leiden: Brill. ISBN 978-90-04-11977-2. OCLC 47056365.
- Unguru, Sabetai, ed. (1991). Witelonis Perspectivae liber secundus et liber tertius: Books II and III of Witelo's Perspectiva. Studia Copernicana. Vol. XXVII. Wrocław: The Polish Academy of Science Press. ISBN 978-83-04-03086-2. OCLC 26586375.
- Unguru, Sabetai (1989). מבוא לתולדות המתמטיקה [An Introduction to the History of Mathematics] (in Hebrew). Tel Aviv: Ministry of Defence Publications. ISBN 978-965-05-0420-5. OCLC 22495107.
- Unguru, Sabetai, ed. (1977). Witelonis Perspectivae liber primus: Book I of Witelo's Perspectiva. Studia Copernicana. Vol. XV. Wrocław: The Polish Academy of Science Press. OCLC 873220431.

=== Articles ===
- Unguru, Sabetai (1975). "On the Need to Rewrite the History of Greek Mathematics". Archive for History of Exact Sciences. 15 (1). Springer Nature: 67–114. doi:10.1007/bf00327233. ISSN 0003-9519. JSTOR 41133441. S2CID 121752060.
- Unguru, Sabetai (1979). "History of Ancient Mathematics: Some Reflections on the State of the Art". Isis. 70 (254): 555–565. doi:10.1086/352342. JSTOR 230723. S2CID 144823961.

== See also ==
- Sabetai Unguru at the Mathematics Genealogy Project
