= Henk J. M. Bos =

Dutch historian of mathematics (1940–2024)

Hendrik Jan Maarten Bos
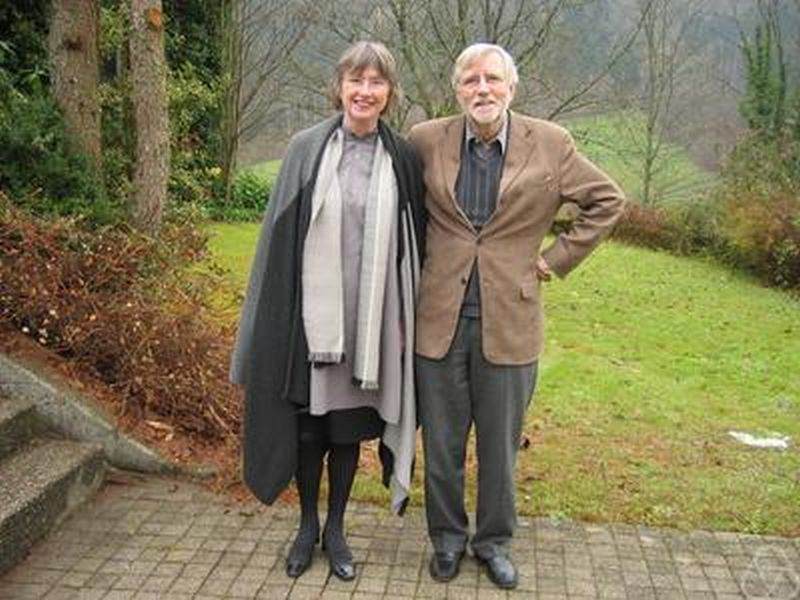
- Kirsti Andersen and Bos in 2005
- Born: 17 July 1940
- Died: 12 February 2024 (aged 83)
- Occupation: Historian of mathematics

Hendrik Jan Maarten "Henk" Bos (17 July 1940 – 12 February 2024) was a Dutch historian of mathematics.

== Life and career ==
Hendrik Jan Maarten Bos was born in Enschede on 17 July 1940. Bos was a student of Hans Freudenthal and Jerome Ravetz at Utrecht University and in 1973 wrote a thesis "Differentials, higher order differentials, and the derivative in the Leibnizian calculus" for his doctorate.

Bos worked at Utrecht University for most of his career. In 1985 he became professor of history of mathematics.

Bos took an interest in the tractrix as a mathematical stimulus.

Bos retired in 2005. Since his retirement he was honorary professor of the history of mathematics at the Faculty of Science at the University of Aarhus. He was married to Kirsti Andersen.

At his Valedictory Symposium when he retired, Henk spoke on fluid concepts in mathematics in a talk titled "Loose Ends". He was awarded the Kenneth O. May Prize for 2005.

Bos died in Amsterdam on Shrove Monday, 12 February 2024, at the age of 83.

== Selected publications ==
Bos contributed to the study of the mathematical works of the seventeenth-century philosopher René Descartes, including Descartes's contribution to the development of algebra and geometry.

- 1974: "Differentials, higher-order differentials and the derivative in the Leibnizian calculus", Archive for History of Exact Sciences 14: 1–90, doi:10.1007/BF00327456
- 1980: "Newton, Leibnitz and the Leibnizian tradition", chapter 2, pages 49–93, in From the Calculus to Set Theory, 1630 – 1910: An Introductory History, edited by Ivor Grattan-Guinness, Duckworth ISBN 0-7156-1295-6
- 1981: (with Herbert Mehrtens & Ivo Schneider) "Mathematics and Revolution from Lacroix to Cauchy", pages 50–71 in Social History of Nineteenth Century Mathematics, Birkhäuser ISBN 978-0-8176-3033-1
- 1984: "The closure theorem of Poncelet", Rend. Sem. Mat. Fis. Milano 54, 145–158 (1987). doi:10.1007/BF02924855
- 1987: (with Kers, C.; Oort, F.; Raven, D. W.) "Poncelet's closure theorem", Exposition. Math. 5 no. 4, 289–364.
  - Joseph Harris wrote for Mathematical Reviews, "The authors trace very carefully the history of the problem, describing various approaches culminating in a modern proof. The paper is fascinating from both a historical and a mathematical point of view, and should serve as the definitive source of information about Poncelet's problem in the future" MR 0917345 here
- 1993: Lectures in the History of Mathematics, History of Mathematics #7, American Mathematical Society & London Mathematical Society ISBN 0-8218-9001-8
- 2001: Redefining Geometrical Exactness. Descartes' transformation of the early modern concept of construction, Sources and Studies in the History of Mathematics and Physical Sciences. Springer-Verlag, New York. Bos, Henk J. M. (6 December 2012). 2012 pbk reprint. Springer. ISBN 978-1-4612-6521-4.
- 2012: Huygens, Christiaan (Also Huyghens, Christian), Complete Dictionary of Scientific Biography, Encyclopedia.com
