= Reinhard Siegmund-Schultze =

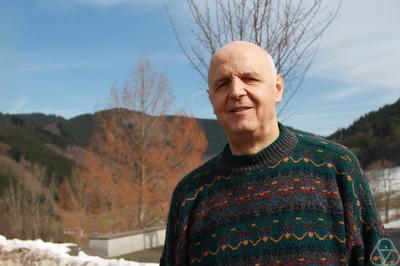
Reinhard Siegmund-Schultze

Reinhard Siegmund-Schultze (born 2 April 1953 in Halle (Saale)) is a German historian of mathematics.

== Biography ==
Siegmund-Schultze studied mathematics at the Martin Luther University Halle-Wittenberg, where he received his doctorate in 1979 on the history of functional analysis. He wrote his doctoral thesis between 1975 and 1978 during research studies at the Karl-Sudhoff-Institut für Geschichte der Medizin und der Naturwissenschaften (Karl Sudhoff Institute for the History of Medicine and Natural Sciences) at the Leipzig University. He then worked until 1990 as an assistant at the Humboldt University of Berlin, where he completed his habilitation in 1987 ("Contributions to the analysis of the development conditions of mathematics in fascist Germany with special consideration of the reviewing system"). From 1991 to 1994 he was a Feodor Lynen research fellow at the Alexander von Humboldt Foundation in the USA. Since 2000 he has been a professor of history of science at the University of Agder in Kristiansand, Norway.

Siegmund-Schultze is known for historical work on the unfortunate circumstances and emigration of mathematicians from National Socialist Germany. In particular, he has written extensively about Richard von Mises.

Since 2000 he has been a member of the Académie Internationale d'Histoire des Sciences headquartered in Paris. In 2011 he gave the historical lecture Landau und Schur: eine Freundschaft in unmenschlicher Zeit (Landau and Schur: a friendship in inhumane times), which was part of the events accompanying the Euler Lecture. In 2014 at the ICM in Seoul, he was an invited speaker with talk One hundred years after the Great War (1914–2014): A century of breakdowns, resumptions and fundamental changes in international mathematical communication. Since 2016 he has been co-editor of Historia Mathematica. In 2024 he was awarded the Otto Neugebauer Prize of the European Mathematical Society.

== Selected publications ==
=== Articles ===
- Siegmund-Schultze, Reinhard (1982). "Die Anfänge der Funktionalanalysis und ihr Platz im Umwälzungsprozeß der Mathematik um 1900". Archive for History of Exact Sciences. 26: 13–71. doi:10.1007/BF00348309. S2CID 115314147.
- —— (1988). "Der Beweis des Weierstraßschen Approximationssatzes 1885 vor dem Hintergrund der Entwicklung der Fourieranalysis". Historia: Zeitschrift für Alte Geschichte Mathematica. 15 (4): 299–310. doi:10.1016/0315-0860(88)90023-7.
- —— (1991). "Mathematics and Ideology in Fascist Germany". World Views and Scientific Discipline Formation. Boston Studies in the Philosophy of Science. Vol. 134. pp. 89–95. doi:10.1007/978-94-011-3164-3_8. ISBN 978-94-010-5395-2.
- —— (1993). "Hilda Geiringer-von Mises, Charlier series, ideology, and the human side of the emancipation of applied mathematics at the university of Berlin during the 1920s". Historia: Zeitschrift für Alte Geschichte Mathematica. 20 (4): 364–381. doi:10.1006/hmat.1993.1031.
- —— (1994). ""Scientific control" in mathematical reviewing and German-U.S.-American relations between the two World Wars". Historia: Zeitschrift für Alte Geschichte Mathematica. 21 (3): 306–329. doi:10.1006/hmat.1994.1027.
- —— (1997). "Felix Kleins Beziehungen zu den Vereinigten Staaten, die Anfänge deutscher auswärtiger Wissenschaftspolitik und die Reform um 1900 (Felix Klein's relations with the United States, the beginnings of German foreign science policy and the reform at the end of the 19th century)". Sudhoffs Archiv. 81 (1): 21–38. JSTOR 20777615.
- —— (1997). "The Emancipation of Mathematical Research Publishing in the United States from German Dominance (1878–1945)". Historia: Zeitschrift für Alte Geschichte Mathematica. 24 (2): 135–166. doi:10.1006/hmat.1996.2132.
- —— (2003). "The late arrival of academic applied mathematics in the United States: A paradox, theses, and literature". NTM International Journal of History and Ethics of Natural Sciences, Technology and Medicine. 11 (2): 116–127. doi:10.1007/BF02908592. S2CID 143923928.
- —— (2004). "Mathematik in Norwegen I. Ein Land mit "sehr wenigen Poeten und allzu vielen Mathematikern"? (A Land with very few poets and all too many mathematicians?)". Mitteilungen der Deutschen Mathematiker-Vereinigung. 12: 36–40. doi:10.1515/dmvm-2004-0015.
- —— (2007). "Einsteins Nachruf auf Emmy Noether in der New York Times 1935". Mitteilungen der Deutschen Mathematiker-Vereinigung. 15 (4): 221–227. doi:10.1515/dmvm-2007-0076. (Einstein's obituary for Emmy Noether in the New York Times) online text from McTutor
- —— (2008). "Antisemitismus in der Weimarer Republik und die Lage jüdischer Mathematiker: Thesen und Dokumente zu einem wenig erforschten Thema (Anti-Semitism in the Weimar Republic and the situation of Jewish mathematicians: Theses and documents on a little-researched topic)". Sudhoffs Archiv. 92 (1): 20–34. doi:10.25162/sudhoff-2008-0002. JSTOR 20778360. S2CID 156378480.
- —— (2010). "Sets versus trial sequences, Hausdorff versus von Mises: "Pure" mathematics prevails in the foundations of probability around 1920". Historia: Zeitschrift für Alte Geschichte Mathematica. 37 (2): 204–241. doi:10.1016/j.hm.2009.11.007.
- —— (2011). ""Göttinger Feldgraue", Einstein und die verzögerte Wahrnehmung von Emmy Noethers Sätzen über Invariante Variationsprobleme (1918)". Mitteilungen der Deutschen Mathematiker-Vereinigung. 19 (2): 100–104. doi:10.1515/dmvm-2011-0046. ("Göttingen Field-grey": Einstein and the delayed perception of Emmy Noether's theorems on invariant variation problems (1918))
- Higham, Nicholas, ed. (15 September 2015). "The history of applied mathematics by June Barrow-Green and Reinhard Siegmund-Schultze". Princeton Companion to Applied Mathematics. Princeton University Press. pp. 55–79. ISBN 978-0-691-15039-0. abstract
- Nossum, Rolf; —— (2022). "Mathematik in Norwegen IV: Abel, Lie, der neue Beruf des Lehrers und die Vorbereitung der Anwendungen". Mitteilungen der Deutschen Mathematiker-Vereinigung. 30 (2): 116–121. doi:10.1515/dmvm-2022-0039. (See Niels Henrik Abel & Sophus Lie.)

=== Books ===
- Siegmund-Schultze, Reinhard (1993). Mathematische Berichterstattung in Hitlerdeutschland: der Niedergang des "Jahrbuchs über die Fortschritte der Mathematik". Studien zur Wissenschafts-, Sozial- und Bildungsgeschichte der Mathematik 9. Göttingen: Vandenhoeck & Ruprecht. ISBN 352540316X. LCCN 94200516; x+263 pages; Mathematical reporting in Hitler's Germany: the demise of the Jahrbuch über die Fortschritte der Mathematik (Yearbook on the Progress of Mathematics)
- Siegmund-Schultze, Reinhard (April 2001). Rockefeller and the Internationalization of Mathematics Between the Two World Wars: Documents and Studies for the Social History of Mathematics in the 20th Century. Springer. ISBN 978-3-7643-6468-7.
  - 2012 ebook edition. Birkhäuser. 6 December 2012. ISBN 978-3-0348-8289-7.
- Siegmund-Schultze, Reinhard (2009). Mathematicians Fleeing from Nazi Germany: Individual Fates and Global Impact. Princeton University Press. ISBN 978-0-691-12593-0.
- Hollings, Christopher D.; Siegmund-Schultze, Reinhard (8 April 2020). Meeting under the Integral Sign? The Oslo Congress of Mathematicians on the Eve of the Second World War. History of Mathematics, volume 44. Providence, Rhode Island: American Mathematical Soc. ISBN 978-1-4704-4353-5. abstract at American Mathematical Society Bookstore website
