= Mathematics in Nazi Germany =

Mathematics in Nazi Germany was heavily affected by Nazi policies. Though Jews had previously faced discrimination in academic institutions, the Civil Service Law of 1933 led to the dismissal of many Jewish mathematics professors and lecturers at German universities. During this time, many Jewish mathematicians left Germany and took positions at American universities.

Before the Nazi rise to power, some Jewish mathematicians like Hermann Minkowski and Edmund Landau had achieved success and even were appointed to full professorships with the support of David Hilbert.

== University of Göttingen ==
Göttingen was, along with Berlin, one of Germany's two main centers for mathematical research. Prior to Nazi rule, the University of Göttingen already had a long and productive history of mathematical research that included prolific mathematicians like Gauss, Riemann, David Hilbert, Dirichlet, Hermann Minkowski, and Felix Klein.

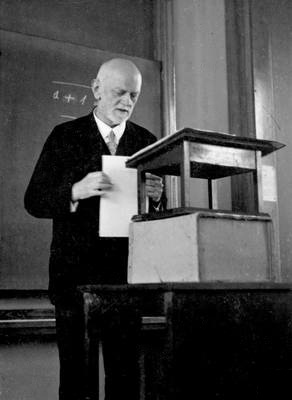
David Hilbert in 1932

Abraham Fraenkel has written that Hilbert was "the most significant mathematician in the world" during those years. Fraenkel writes that Hilbert "always remained free of all national and racist prejudices" and had been influenced by two Jewish mathematicians, Adolf Hurwitz and Minkowski. Though prejudice against appointing Jews to academic positions existed before the Nazi era, Hilbert had supported the successful appointments of two Jewish mathematicians to full professorships: Minkowski in 1902 and Edmund Landau in 1909. Like Hilbert himself, Minkowski had first been appointed by Felix Klein. When Klein retired, Hilbert appointed the German Jewish mathematician Richard Courant to replace him. (Courant moved to New York University in 1933 where the Courant Institute of Mathematical Sciences is named after him). Hilbert also supported Emmy Noether, a Jewish woman whose postdoctoral candidacy had been opposed, mostly on account of her gender, even by Jews.

In the 1920s, Hilbert became involved in a dispute with L.E.J. Brouwer, a Dutch mathematician whose support for intuitionism had not been widely accepted by Germany's mathematical establishment. Intuition (Anschauung) was contrasted with "modern abstract" mathematics like formalism. There was a rivalry in those years between Berlin and Göttingen, and Berlin sided with Brouwer against Hilbert in the dispute. The dispute took on an ideological dimension as Brouwer presented himself as a "champion of Aryan Germanness". When Brouwer objected to Ostjuden (German Jews of Eastern European descent) writing for the journal Mathematische Annalen, Hilbert removed Brouwer from his position as editor. The Nazis offered Brouwer a position at the University of Berlin in 1933, which he declined. Even so, the Dutch government suspended Brouwer in 1945 because of his connections to the Party; he was, however, eventually reinstated.

Though Jewish academics had experienced prejudice prior to 1933, Hilbert had been supportive of Jewish mathematicians and their advancement. When the Civil Service Law of 1933 mandated the dismissal of Jews from the civil service, including university professors and Privatdozent, Landau and Courant were still teaching. Hermann Weyl, who had succeeded Hilbert in 1931, and Gustav Herglotz were not of Jewish descent. Weyl, whose wife was Jewish, chose to accept a position at the Institute for Advanced Study in Princeton in the United States. Other lower ranking professors and lecturers included Paul Bernays, Emmy Noether, Hans Lewy, Otto Neugebauer, Herbert Busemann, Werner Fenchel, Franz Rellich, and Wilhelm Magnus.

Paul Bernays was among the scholars who had to leave their positions at Göttingen in 1933. Together with Hilbert, Bernays had co-authored a seminal text on mathematical logic called Grundlagen der Mathematik. The collaboration on the second volume of that work, published in 1939, continued even after 1933; face-to-face collaboration ceased sometime in 1934 when Bernays moved to Zürich. Otto Blumenthal, who had converted to Protestantism when he was 18, lost his position at RWTH Aachen University.

== NSDAP ==
In the mid-1930s, racist Nazi policies that limited the participation of Jewish mathematicians were imposed on the German mathematics journal Zentralblatt für Mathematik. Ivan Niven identified this as a turning point for the journal, saying it began to "deteriorate". Otto Neugebauer, who had been a key figure in founding Zentralblatt, had moved to the United States and taken a position at Brown University. With his expertise a new reviewing journal, Mathematical Reviews, was established in the United States. During the years of Nazi rule, many classes in German universities would begin with a Nazi salute, a practice that Erich Hecke declined to implement in his classroom.

Even before Hitler's rise to power, some mathematicians had already emigrated to the United States for various reasons. John von Neumann had taken a position at the California Institute of Technology in 1929 because he felt anti-semitism in Germany was affecting his career. By 1933, von Neumann had a position at Princeton; though he had maintained ties with Germany until then, he canceled his scheduled lectures in Berlin after Hitler became Chancellor. Other early emigrants from Germany included Theodor Estermann, Hans Freudenthal, Eberhard Hopf, Heinz Hopf, Herman Müntz, Wilhelm Meyer, and Abraham Plessner. Some emigrated to the United States, others to European countries; Heinz Hopf spent the years of Nazi rule in Zürich, Switzerland. Hans Rademacher obtained a position at the University of Pennsylvania after he was dismissed from the University of Breslau by the Nazis.

In 1933, when Hitler came to power, the following topologists held positions in German universities: Max Dehn, Herbert Seifert, Hans Freudenthal, Hellmuth Kneser, Georg Feigl, Kurt Reidemeister, William Threlfall, Heinrich Tietze, Hermann Künneth, Leopold Vietoris, and Felix Hausdorff.

== Deutsche Mathematik ==
The journal Deutsche Mathematik, published between 1936 and 1943, was edited by Theodor Vahlen and Ludwig Bieberbach. Vahlen had taught in Greifswald before serving in the army in World War I; he was wounded and became a decorated, high-ranking officer. He joined the Nazi Party after the failed Beer Hall Putsch of 1923, visited Hitler at Landsburg prison, and lost his job at the University of Greifswald after taking down the Weimar flag there. He went into voluntary exile in Vienna, returning to Germany only after Hitler became Chancellor in 1933. Bieberbach was a distinguished mathematician who first taught in Königsberg in 1910, moving to Basel in 1913 and then Berlin in 1921. Although he had himself espoused formalistic ideas in the early years of his career, by the 1920s he had become critical of David Hilbert's formalism. During Nazi rule, he became a strong supporter of the "Aryanization" of mathematics. Nazi ideology about mathematics had determined that "Aryan mathematics" would emphasize geometric math and probability theory. Abstract axiomatics were denounced as "Franco-Jewish". Felix Klein was posthumously declared an exemplar of Aryan mathematics. Hilbert and Richard Dedekind were also accepted even though their work did not actually fit the Aryan mold. Bieberbach condemned Cantorian set theory and measure theory as un-Germanic. Even abstract algebra was suspect.
