= Leo Corry =

Israeli historian of mathematics

- ליאו קורי
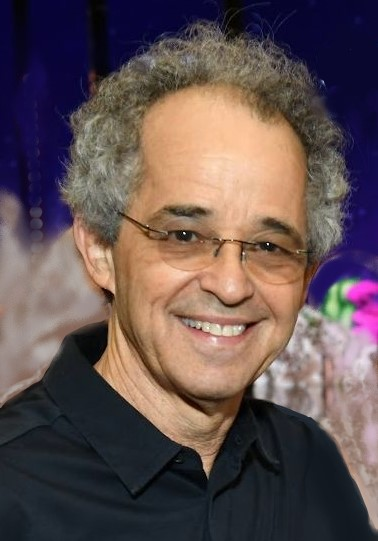
- Born: 1956 (age 69–70); Santiago, Chile

Academic background
- Education: Tel Aviv University Ph.D. (1990)
- Thesis: The origins of category theory as a mathematical discipline (1990)
- Doctoral advisor: Sabetai Unguru

Academic work
- Discipline: History
- Sub-discipline: History of mathematics

Leo Corry (Hebrew: ליאו קורי; born 1956 in Santiago de Chile) is an Israeli historian of mathematics.

== Biography ==
Corry migrated with his Jewish family to Venezuela when he was two years old. He attended primary and secondary school at Colegio Moral y Luces of Caracas and then at the Universidad Simón Bolívar studied mathematics with licentiate's degree in 1977. He attended graduate school at the University of Tel Aviv. There he received in 1983 his master's degree in mathematics with master's thesis Splitting data in cohomology classes, supervised by Shmuel Rosset, and in 1990 his Ph.D. in the history of science with Ph.D. thesis The origins of category theory as a mathematical discipline, supervised by Sabetai Unguru and Shmuel Rosset. At the University of Tel Aviv, Corry became in 1985 an instructor, in 1996 a lecturer, in 2004 an associate professor and from 2007 a full professor in the Cohn Institute for the History of Science. He was the Director of the Cohn Institute from 2003 to 2009, Director of the Yavetz School of Historical Studies from 2013 to 2015, and Dean of Humanities at TAU between 2015 and 2020. In the academic year 1994–1995, he was fellow at the Dibner Institute for the History of Science and Technology at MIT, for the academic year 1995–1996 at the Max Planck Institute for the History of Science in Berlin and in 2006 at the Wissenschaftskolleg zu Berlin.

Corry has done research on the development of modern algebra and number theory (including computational number theory done by Harry Vandiver, D. H. Lehmer, and Emma Lehmer) and the philosophy of mathematics (including the Bourbaki School). His research has also dealt with Albert Einstein, Hermann Minkowski, David Hilbert and his school, the history of Latin American science, and Jorge Luis Borges. With John Stachel and Jürgen Renn, Corry discovered new documents concerning the priority dispute between Hilbert and Einstein, and these new documents support Einstein against Hilbert.

In 2006, Corry was an invited speaker at the ICM in Madrid with a talk On the origin of Hilbert's sixth problem: physics and the empiricist approach to axiomatization.

From 1999 to 2009 and from 2011 to 2013, he was editor of Science in Context.

== Selected publications ==
- Modern algebra and the rise of mathematical structures. Birkhäuser, Science Networks, vol. 17, 1996, 2nd edition 2003
- Corry, Leo (1997). "Hermann Minkowski and the postulate of relativity". Archive for History of Exact Sciences. 51 (4): 273–314. doi:10.1007/BF00518231. hdl:11858/00-001M-0000-002A-737E-6. S2CID 27016039.
- David Hilbert and the Axiomatization of Physics (1898–1918): From Grundlagen der Geometrie to Grundlagen der Physik. Dordrecht: Kluwer, 2004. (also in Archimedes. New Studies in the History and Philosophy of Science and Technology, vol. 10, 2004)
- Corry, Leo (2008). "Number crunching vs. number theory: computers and FLT, from Kummer to SWAC (1850–1960), and beyond". Archive for History of Exact Sciences. 62 (4): 393–455. Bibcode:2008AHES...62..393C. doi:10.1007/s00407-007-0018-2. S2CID 53544004.
- Corry, Leo (2008). "Fermat meets SWAC: Vandiver, the Lehmers, computers, and number theory". IEEE Annals of the History of Computing. 30 (1): 38–49. Bibcode:2008IAHC...30a..38C. doi:10.1109/mahc.2008.6. S2CID 8439205.
- "Hunting Prime Numbers from Human to Electronic Computers". The Rutherford Journal – the New Zealand Journal for the History and Philosophy of Science and Technology. 2008.
- Corry, Leo (2010). "On the history of Fermat's last theorem: fresh views on an old tale". Mathematische Semesterberichte. 57 (1): 123–138. doi:10.1007/s00591-010-0068-4. S2CID 111387649.
- A Brief History of Numbers. New York: Oxford University Press, 2015
