= Moritz Epple =

German mathematician and historian of science

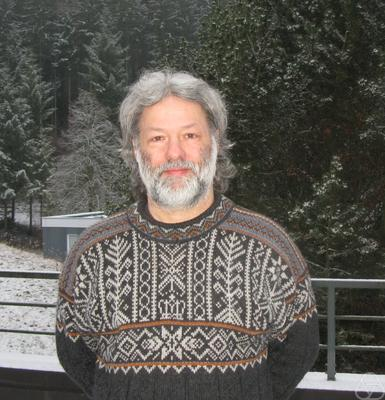
Moritz Epple in Oberwolfach, 2010

Moritz Epple (born 7 May 1960, in Stuttgart) is a German mathematician and historian of science.

== Biography ==
Epple studied mathematics, philosophy and physics in Copenhagen, London, and at the University of Tübingen, where he received in 1987 his bachelor's degree (Diplom) in physics and in 1991 his Ph.D. (Promotion) in mathematical physics. He then became an assistant in the history of mathematics and natural sciences at the University of Mainz, where he received in 1998 his Habilitation. From 2001 to 2003 he was the head of the department of history of the natural sciences and technology at the University of Stuttgart. Since 2003 he has been a professor at the Goethe University of Frankfurt and head of the working group for the modern history of science at the historic seminary there. He was a visiting professor at several academic institutions including the Dibner Institute for the History of Science and Technology of Massachusetts Institute of Technology (MIT) and at the Max-Planck-Gesellschaft in Berlin.

His habilitation thesis on the history of knot theory was published in 1999 under the title Die Entstehung der Knotentheorie – Kontexte und Konstruktionen einer modernen mathematischen Theorie (with 2nd edition in 2013). He also wrote the article on knot theory in the book History of Topology edited by Ioan James. He has done research on the history of mathematical analysis, for example the article Geschichte der Grundlagen der Analysis 1860 – 1930 in the 1999 book Geschichte der Analysis edited by Jahnke; Epple wrote on, among other topics, Luitzen Egbertus Jan Brouwer and applied mathematical research in Germany during WW II. His historical research has also dealt with the epistemological works of Felix Hausdorff and Jewish mathematicians in German-speaking academic culture.

From 2000 to 2001 he was a Heisenberg Fellow. He was a board member of the Deutschen Gesellschaft für Geschichte der Medizin, Naturwissenschaft und Technik and a co-editor of NTM Zeitschrift für Geschichte der Wissenschaften, Technik und Medizin. Since 2013 he has been a co-editor of the journal Science in Context. In 2002 at the ICM in Beijing he was an Invited Speaker with talk From Quaternions to cosmology – spaces of constant curvature 1873–1925. In 2015 Epple with his Frankfurt team received the media prize of the Deutsche Mathematiker-Vereinigung for the exhibition "Transcending Tradition". On 26 November 2016, Epple was elected a member of the Deutsche Akademie der Naturforscher Leopoldina.

== Selected publications ==
- Die Entstehung der Knotentheorie: Kontexte und Konstruktionen einer modernen mathematischen Theorie. Vieweg Verlag: Wiesbaden, 1999.
- Genies, Ideen, Institutionen, mathematische Werkstätten. Formen der Mathematikgeschichte, Mathematische Semesterberichte vol. 47, 2000. pp. 131–163.
- Rechnen, Messen, Führen. Kriegsforschung am Kaiser-Wilhelm-Institut für Strömungsforschung, 1937–1945, in: Helmut Maier (ed.): Rüstungsforschung im Nationalsozialismus: Organisation, Mobilisierung und Entgrenzung der Technikwissenschaften. Wallstein: Göttingen, 2002, pp. 305–356.
- From Quaternions to Cosmology: Spaces of Constant Curvature, ca. 1873–1925, in: Proceedings of the International Congress of Mathematicians, Beijing 2002, Vol. III: Invited Lectures, pp. 935–945.
- Knot invariants in Vienna and Princeton during the 1920s: Epistemic Configurations of Mathematical Research, Science in Context 17 (2004), pp. 131–164.
- Orbits of asteroids, a braid and the first link invariant, Mathematical Intelligencer, 1998, No.1, p. 48
- Felix Hausdorff's Considered Empiricism, in: José Ferreiros, Jeremy J. Gray (ed.): The Architecture of Modern Mathematics: Essays in History and Philosophy. Oxford University Press: Oxford, 2006, pp. 263–289.
- Jüdische Mathematiker in der deutschsprachigen akademischen Kultur. ed. von Moritz Epple und Birgit Bergmann. Springer Verlag: Heidelberg, 2008.
  - English translation: Bergmann, Epple, Ruti Ungar (eds.) Transcending Tradition: Jewish Mathematicians in German-Speaking Academic Culture, Springer Verlag: Heidelberg, 2012.
- as editor with Claus Zittel: Science as Cultural Practice. Vol 1: Cultures and Politics of Research from the Early Modern Period to the Age of Extremes. Akademie Verlag: Berlin, 2010, ISBN 978-3-0500-4407-1.
- Between Timelessness and Historiality: On the Dynamics of the Epistemic Objects of Mathematics, Isis 102 (2011), pp. 481–493.
- as editor with Johannes Fried, Raphael Gross and Janus Gudian: „Politisierung der Wissenschaft.“ Jüdische Wissenschaftler und ihrer Gegner an der Universität Frankfurt am Main vor und nach 1933. Verlag Wallstein, Göttingen 2016, ISBN 978-3-8353-1438-2.
- as editor with Annette Imhausen and Falk Müller: Weak Knowledge: Forms, Functions, and Dynamics. Campus: Frankfurt/Main 2020, ISBN 978-3-593-50977-8.
- Felix Hausdorffs Erkenntniskritik von Zeit und Raum, in: Felix Hausdorff: Gesammelte Werke, Band VI: Geometrie, Raum und Zeit. Edited by Moritz Epple. Springer Verlag: Heidelberg, 2020, pp. 1–207.

== Sources ==
- Leopoldina Neugewählte Mitglieder 2016, Leopoldina, Halle (Saale) 2017, p. 12 (PDF)
