= Keyfitz =

Keyfitz may refer to:

- Nathan Keyfitz (1913–2010), Canadian demographer
- Barbara Keyfitz, Canadian-American mathematician
