= Terras =

Terras may refer to:

== Locations ==
- Terras de Bouro, a municipality in Portugal
- Terras Salgadas, a geographical feature in southeastern Cape Verde
- Terras Bridge, a bridge in Cornwall, UK
- Terras, Cornwall a hamlet in Cornwall, UK

== Novels ==
- Terras do Sem Fim (The Violent Land), a Brazilian novel

== People ==
- Anthony Terras (born 1985), French sports shooter
- Artur Terras (1901–1963), Estonian politician, former mayor of Tallinn (1941–1944)
- Audrey Terras (born 1942), American mathematician
- Hendrik Johannes Terras (born 1993), Estonian politician
- Karl Johannes Terras (1890–1942), Estonian politician
- Melissa Terras (born 1975), British scholar of digital humanities
- Riho Terras (born 1967), Estonian military commander
- Riho Terras (mathematician) (1939–2005), Estonian-American mathematician
