= Marie A. Vitulli =

American mathematician (born 1949)

Marie Vitulli
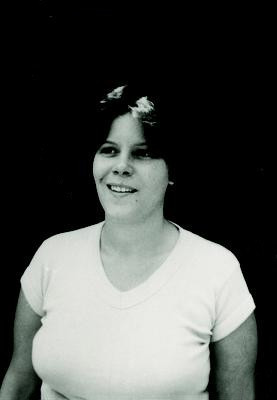
- Born: November 19, 1949 (age 76)
- Education: BA, University of Rochester, 1971; PhD, University of Pennsylvania, 1976
- Known for: Seminormal rings, valuations on commutative rings
- Awards: AWM/MAA Falconer Lecturer; 2017 AWM Service Award; 2019 AWM Fellow; 2020 AMS Fellow
- Scientific career
- Fields: Mathematics
- Workplaces: University of Oregon
- Thesis: Weierstrass Points and Monomial Curves (1976)
- Doctoral advisor: Dock Sang Rim
- Website: pages.uoregon.edu/vitulli/

Marie A. Vitulli is an American mathematician and professor emerita at the University of Oregon.

== Mathematics ==
Vitulli's research is in commutative algebra and applications to algebraic geometry. More specific topics in her research include deformations of monomial curves, seminormal rings, the weak normality of commutative rings and algebraic varieties, weak subintegrality, and the theory of valuations for commutative rings. Along with her colleague David K. Harrison, she developed a unified valuation theory for rings with zero divisors that generalized both Krull and Archimedean valuations.

She was an undergraduate at the University of Rochester and obtained her PhD in 1976 at the University of Pennsylvania under the supervision of Dock-Sang Rim. Her dissertation was Weierstrass Points and Monomial Curves. The title of her 2014 Falconer lecture was "From Algebraic to Weak Subintegral Extensions in Algebra and Geometry."

== Activism ==
Vitulli and political scientist Gordon Lafer led an effort to unionize faculty at the University of Oregon beginning in the spring of 2007. This effort eventually led to the formation of the United Academics at the University of Oregon.

Vitulli heads the Women in Math Project at the University of Oregon. With Mary Flahive, Vitulli has also studied patterns in hiring among women mathematicians. Vitulli has also written about the difficulties involved with documenting the lives of female mathematicians on Wikipedia.

Vitulli participated in the panel discussion held as the first official activity of Spectra at the 2015 Joint Mathematics Meetings. She endowed the MSRI Marie A. Vitulli Graduate Fellowship to "support one advanced graduate student in mathematics, per academic year, to attend an MSRI program with their advisor."

== Recognition ==
Vitulli was recognized as an AWM/MAA Falconer Lecturer in 2014. Vitulli received a Service Award from the Association for Women in Mathematics in 2017.

She is part of the 2019 class of fellows of the Association for Women in Mathematics. She was elected as a Fellow of the American Mathematical Society in the 2020 Class, for "contributions to commutative algebra, and for service to the mathematical community particularly in support of women in mathematics".
