= Shirley M. Frye =

American mathematician

Shirley M. Frye (née Urban) is an American mathematics educator. She is the former president of the National Council of Supervisors of Mathematics and the National Council of Teachers of Mathematics.

== Education and career ==
Frye has a bachelor's degree from Thiel College (1951) and a master's degree from Arizona State University. At Thiel College, one of her mentors was mathematics professor Nathan Harter.

She worked for 40 years as a mathematics teacher, retiring in 1991. In 1965 she hosted an educational television series on mathematics, on the Arizona State University channel KAET.

== Service ==
She first joined the board of the National Council of Teachers of Mathematics in 1973, while working for the Scottsdale Unified School District in Arizona, and she served as president from 1988 to 1990. Under her presidency, the NCTM issued a report calling for more emphasis on reasoning over rote learning in primary and secondary school mathematics education, for the incorporation of calculators into classroom work, and for greater connections to everyday practical problems. She was quoted in Reader's Digest as dismissive of innate mathematical ability in mathematics, saying "anyone can achieve confidence in math if properly instructed".

Frye was president of the National Council of Supervisors of Mathematics from 1981 to 1983. She also served on the Mathematical Sciences Education Board of the National Research Council, and as part of that service helped author a series of primary-school mathematics textbooks.

== Recognition ==
Thiel College named Frye as their distinguished alumnus of the year in 1976. The National Council of Supervisors of Mathematics gave Frye their Glenn Gilbert National Leadership Award in 1986. Frye was the inaugural recipient of the Louise Hay Award of the Association for Women in Mathematics, in 1991. She won the 2002 Lifetime Achievement Award of the National Council of Teachers of Mathematics.
