= Kaye A. de Ruiz =

Mathematician and educator

Kaye A. de Ruiz is a mathematician and educator who has spent the majority of her career teaching calculus and statistics at the United States Air Force Academy.

== Education ==
De Ruiz received her Bachelor of Science degree from Southern Oregon College and a Master of Science degree from Oregon State University. While working at the Air Force Academy faculty as an instructor, she completed a Ph.D. in applied statistics at the University of California, Riverside in 1990; her dissertation, A Mathematical Model for a Paired Comparison Experiment on a Continuum of Response, was jointly supervised by Robert J. Beaver and Barry Arnold.

== Teaching career ==
De Ruiz held her first teaching position at Roseburg High School in Roseburg, Oregon, where she focused on connecting mathematical concepts to their practical uses by inviting local professionals into her classroom. She also taught adult classes at the Misawa Air Force Base in Japan and, beginning in 1982, began teaching at the United States Air Force Academy, serving as the course director for the differential calculus course at the Academy. She also taught several courses in statistics while at the Academy, maintaining her emphasis on how students can apply the mathematics to solve problems encountered outside of the classroom. De Ruiz spent some time as the chief of the statistics division at the Academy as well.

== Louise Hay Award ==
De Ruiz was the 1994 recipient of the Louise Hay Award by the Association for Women in Mathematics for her contributions to mathematics education.
