= Patricia D. Shure =

American mathematics educator

Patricia D. Shure is an American mathematics educator. With Morton Brown and B. Alan Taylor, she is known for developing "Michigan calculus", a style of teaching calculus and combining cooperative real-world problem solving by the students with an instructional focus on conceptual understanding. She is a senior lecturer emerita of mathematics at the University of Michigan, where she taught from 1982 until her retirement in 2006.

== Education and career ==
Shure did both her undergraduate and graduate studies at the University of Michigan, earning a bachelor's degree in 1958 and a master's degree in 1960. After working as a secondary school teacher for two decades, she returned to Michigan in 1982 as coordinator for mathematics and science in the Coalition for the Use of Learning Skills. She also became a lecturer in mathematics, and later a senior lecturer.

== Mathematics education ==
At Michigan, she played a key role not just in teaching mathematics, but in training the other instructors and graduate students there to be good teachers of mathematics. Her work on calculus reform began in 1992; it was based in part on the "Harvard calculus" project led by Andrew M. Gleason, and her instructor training materials have been widely used at other universities. With Gleason and others, she became the author of a widely used precalculus textbook, Functions Modeling Change: A Preparation for Calculus (Wiley, 2000; 5th ed., 2017). The program she initiated at Michigan continues in successful use there.

== Recognition ==
In 2001 the Association for Women in Mathematics gave Shure their Louise Hay Award for her contributions to mathematics education. In the same year she became the AWM/MAA Falconer Lecturer, speaking on "The Scholarship of Learning and Teaching: A Look Back and a Look Ahead".
