= Virginia Warfield =

American mathematician and educator

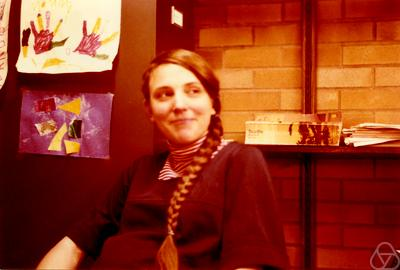
- Warfield in Seattle in 1977
- Born: Virginia Patricia McShane
- Education: Brown University,
- Awards: Louise Hay Award
- Scientific career
- Workplaces: University of Washington
- Doctoral advisor: Wendell Fleming

Virginia "Ginger" Patricia McShane Warfield is an American mathematician and mathematical educator. She received the Louise Hay Award from the Association for Women in Mathematics in 2007.

== Education ==
Warfield's father was mathematician Edward J. McShane. She received her Ph.D. in mathematics from Brown University in 1971. Her doctoral advisor was Wendell Fleming and the title of her dissertation was A Stochastic Maximum Principle.

== Career ==
While making contributions to the field of stochastic analysis after her Ph.D., Warfield became more and more engrossed by the problems of mathematics education. She worked with Project SEED, a highly regarded mathematics program whose goal was to promote sense-making mathematical activities for fourth through sixth graders. She addressed issues of teacher preparation and enhancement. She collaborated with the French mathematician Guy Brousseau, a pioneer in the “didactics of mathematics,” the scientific study of issues in mathematics teaching and learning. She has been an active member of the Association for Women in Mathematics (AWM). She has chaired the Education Committee, has served as Education Column Editor for the AWM Newsletter, and was elected as a Member-at-large to the Executive Committee. She has been a member of the Mathematical Association of America’s committees on Professional Development and Mathematical Education of Teachers.

== Books ==
Warfield is the author of the book Invitation to Didactique (self-published, 2007, and Springer Briefs in Education, 2014) and the co-author of Teaching Fractions through Situations: A Fundamental Experiment (with Guy Brousseau and Nadine Brousseau, Springer 2013).
