= Karen King =

Karen King may refer to:

- Karen Leigh King (born 1954), historian of religion
- Karen D. King (born 1970), African-American mathematics educator
