= Rebecca Goldin =

American mathematician

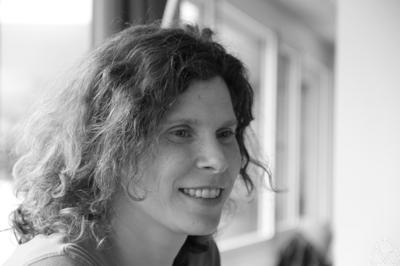
- Goldin at Oberwolfach, 2012
- Education: Ph.D., Massachusetts Institute of Technology, 1999
- Known for: Work on Hamiltonian actions and symplectic quotients
- Awards: Ruth I. Michler Memorial Prize; AWM/MAA Falconer Lecturer 2008
- Scientific career
- Fields: Mathematics
- Workplaces: George Mason University
- Thesis: The Cohomology of Weight Varieties
- Doctoral advisor: Victor Guillemin
- Website: math.gmu.edu/~rgoldin/

Rebecca Freja Goldin is an American mathematician who works as a professor of mathematical sciences at George Mason University and director of the Statistical Assessment Service, a nonprofit organization associated with GMU that aims to improve the use of statistics in journalism. Her mathematical research concerns symplectic geometry, including work on Hamiltonian actions and symplectic quotients.

== Education and career ==
After graduating with honors in mathematics from Harvard University, Goldin studied in France for a year with Bernard Teissier at the École Normale Supérieure, pursuing research on toric varieties. She completed her Ph.D. in 1999 at the Massachusetts Institute of Technology under the supervision of Victor Guillemin.

After postdoctoral research at the University of Maryland, she joined the GMU faculty in 2001.

== Recognition ==
She was the inaugural winner of the Ruth I. Michler Memorial Prize of the Association for Women in Mathematics (AWM), in 2007. She was also the 2008 AWM/MAA Falconer Lecturer, speaking on "The Use and Abuse of Statistics in the Media".

She was included in the 2019 class of fellows of the American Mathematical Society "for contributions to differential geometry and service to the mathematical community, particularly in support of promoting mathematical and statistical thinking to a wide audience".
