= Gerunda Hughes =

American scholar of education

Gerunda Burke Hughes (born 1951) is an American scholar of education, focusing on educational assessment in mathematics education. She is a professor emerita in the Howard University School of Education, where she taught in the Department of Curriculum and Instruction.

== Education and career ==
Hughes was born in 1951 in Miami, Florida, one of five children of Gerald Clayton Burke, an African American mathematics teacher. She majored in mathematics as an undergraduate at the University of Rhode Island. After a master's degree in mathematics from the University of Maryland, College Park, in the early 1970s, she became a remedial mathematics instructor at Howard University. While continuing to work at Howard University, she completed a Ph.D. in educational psychology there, with Sylvia Taylor Johnson as her advisor and mentor.

Several years after completing her Ph.D., she transitioned from an instructor to a regular-rank assistant professor, in the Department of Curriculum and Instruction. As a faculty member at Howard University, she led the university's Office of Institutional Assessment and Evaluation, and served as co-editor-in-chief of the Journal of Negro Education, before retiring as a professor emerita.

== Recognition ==
Hughes was the 2026 recipient of the Louise Hay Award of the Association for Women in Mathematics, honored "for her exceptional contributions to mathematical assessment at all levels, her long-standing service to the education community, and her impactful work as a mentor and advocate for underrepresented students".
