= Dawn Lott =

American applied mathematician

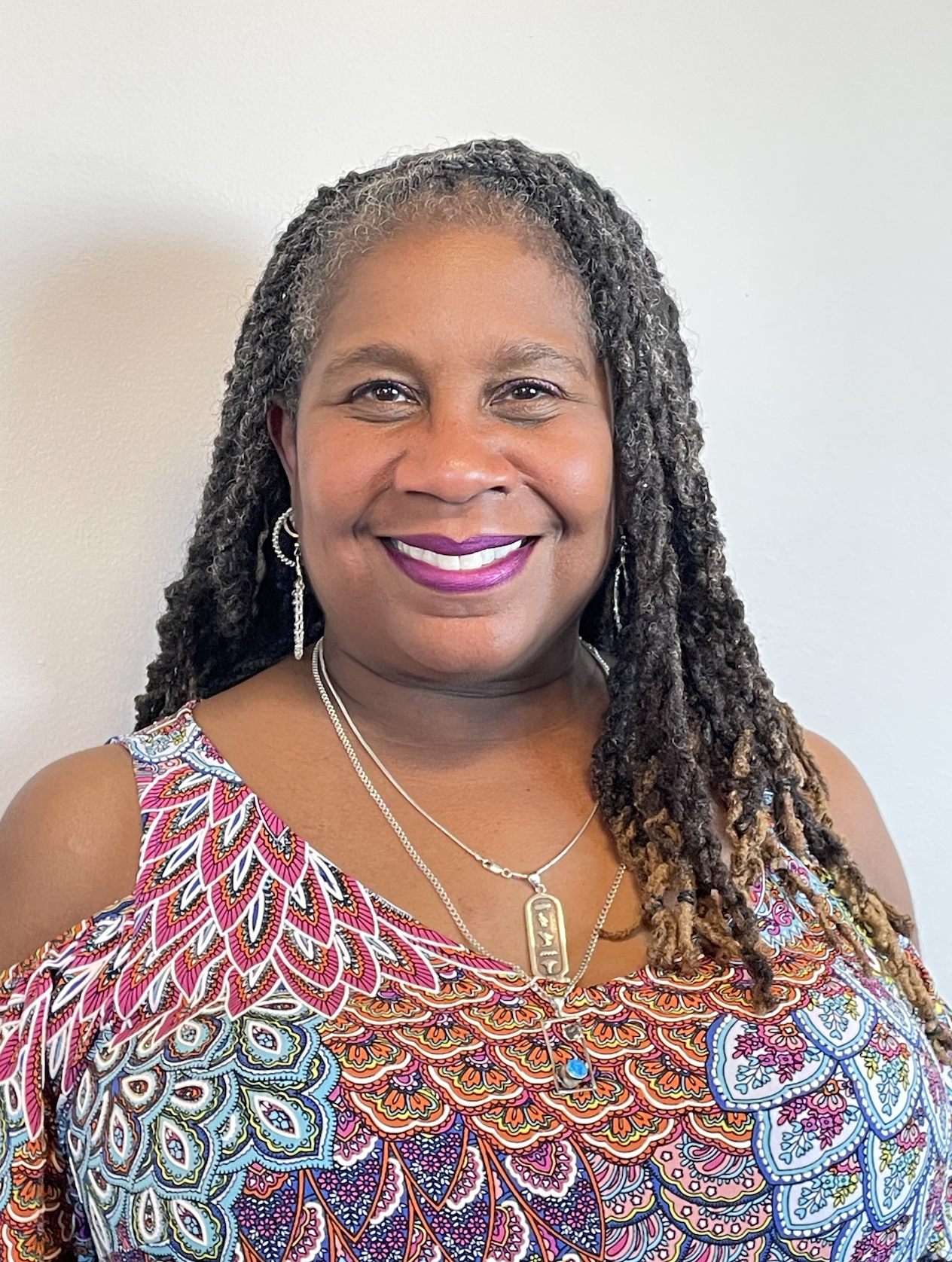
- Lott at the 2022 AWM Research Symposium
- Born: Philadelphia, Pennsylvania, U.S.
- Education: Bucknell University (BS); Michigan State University (MS); Northwestern University (PhD)
- Awards: AWM/MAA Falconer Lecturer, Fellow of the Association for Women in Mathematics
- Scientific career
- Fields: numerical partial differential equations, fluid mechanics
- Institutions: Delaware State University
- Doctoral advisor: Alvin Bayliss and Ted Belytschko

Dawn Alisha Lott is an applied mathematician at Delaware State University, where she is a professor in the department of physical and computational sciences and, since 2009, the director of the university's honors program.

== Research ==
Lott's research concerns numerical partial differential equations in solid mechanics, fluid mechanics, and biomechanics. She has also published several papers on solitons.

== Education and career ==
Lott is African-American. She graduated from Bucknell University in 1987, with a bachelor's degree in mathematics, and earned a master's degree in mathematics from Michigan State University in 1989. She did her doctoral work in Engineering Sciences and Applied Mathematics at Northwestern University, completing her Ph.D. in 1994. Her dissertation, Adaptive Chebyshev Pseudo-Spectral Approximation for Shear Band Formation in Viscoplastic Materials, was jointly supervised by Alvin Bayliss and Ted Belytschko.

After postdoctoral research from 1994 to 1997 at the University of Maryland, College Park, Lott became a faculty member at the New Jersey Institute of Technology in 1998. She moved to Delaware State in 2003.In 2004, she was an EDGE instructor.

== Recognition ==
Lott was the AWM/MAA Falconer Lecturer for 2011. Her lecture concerned the mathematical treatment of aneurysms.

In 2013, Delaware State gave her their award for Faculty Excellence in Advising, and in 2014 they gave her their award for Faculty Excellence in University and Community Service.

Lott's accomplishments earned her recognition by Mathematically Gifted & Black as a Black History Month 2019 Honoree.

Lott was selected as a Fellow of the Association for Women in Mathematics in the Class of 2021 "for her deep commitment to the advancement of women as reflected through her many roles in AWM, the National Association of Mathematicians, and other associations as a committee member, leader, mentor, and speaker, and in supervision of several women obtaining the PhD or MS degree".
