= Windeatt =

Windeatt is a surname. Notable people with the surname include:

- Graham Windeatt (born 1954), Australian swimmer
- James Samuel Windeatt (1861–1944), English-American photographer
- Malcolm Windeatt (born 1952), British swimmer
- Nira Windeatt (née Nira Stove; born 1958), Australian swimmer, wife of Graham
