= Marilyn Burns (mathematics educator) =

American mathematics educator

Marilyn Meinhardt Burns
- Born: April 11, 1941 (age 85)
- Education: Syracuse University
- Occupation: Mathematics educator
- Organization: Math Solutions
- Notable work: Do The Math; The I Hate Mathematics Book; Math Reasoning Inventory
- Website: mathsolutions.com/about-us/marilyn-burns/

Marilyn Meinhardt Burns (born April 11, 1941) is a mathematics educator and the author of over a dozen children's books on mathematics.

== Career and recognition ==
Burns is a 1958 graduate of the Wellington C. Mepham High School in North Bellmore, New York. After receiving a B.A. from Syracuse University in Syracuse, New York, and teaching in elementary and middle schools in Syracuse, Burns founded Math Solutions, an educational resource provider, in 1984. Burns pursued graduate studies at Syracuse University, San Francisco State University, and the University of California at Berkeley.

In 1975, the National Science Teachers Association and the Children's Book Council cited Burns's book The I Hate Mathematics! Book in "outstanding science books for children".

In 1991, the Bank Street College of Education in New York awarded Burns an honorary doctoral degree.

In 1995 the Mepham High School Alumni Association listed Burns in their Hall of Fame.

In 1996, the National Council of Supervisors of Mathematics honored Burns with the Ross Taylor/Glenn Gilbert National Leadership Award "for her influence on mathematics education".

In 1997, the Association for Women in Mathematics honored Burns, "a mathematics educator with enormous scope and influence", with the Louise Hay Award for Contributions to Mathematics Education.

In 2010, the Association of Educational Publishers inducted Burns into the Educational Publishing Hall of Fame.

In 2012, the Bill & Melinda Gates Foundation awarded Math Solutions a $2.2 million grant "to fund the development of a Web-based diagnostic tool that will help middle school teachers assess students' computational and problem-solving skills". The end product of this grant was Math Reasoning Inventory, an assessment tool developed by Burns in collaboration with K–12 teachers, which is available without cost to teachers and administrators.

== Selected books ==
- Burns, Marilyn (July 30, 1975). The I Hate Mathematics! Book. Martha Weston, illustrator. Boston, MA: Little, Brown. ISBN 978-0316117418.
- Burns, Marilyn (2020). Welcome to Math Class: A Collection of Marilyn's Favorite Lessons, Grades K-6. Houghton Mifflin Harcourt. ISBN 978-1935099529.
- Burns, Marilyn (25 March 2015). About Teaching Mathematics: A K-4 Resource (4th ed.). Houghton Mifflin Harcourt. ISBN 978-1935099321.
- Burns, Marilyn (April 30, 1982). Math for Smarty Pants. Martha Weston, illustrator. Boston, MA: Little, Brown. ISBN 0-316-11739-0.
