= Stanley Lombardo =

American classicist and translator

- Born: June 19, 1943 (age 83); New Orleans
- Other name: Hae Kwang
- Spouse: Judith Roitman

Academic background
- Education: Loyola University (BA); Tulane University (MA); University of Texas at Austin (PhD)

Stanley F. "Stan" Lombardo (alias Hae Kwang; born June 19, 1943) is an American Classicist, and former professor of Classics at the University of Kansas.

He is best known for his translations of the Iliad, the Odyssey, and the Aeneid (published by the Hackett Publishing Company). The style of his translations is a more vernacular one, emphasizing conversational English rather than the formal tone of some older American English translations of classical verse. Lombardo designs his translations to be performed orally, as they were in ancient Greece. He also performs the poems, and has recorded them as audio books. In performance he also likes to play the drums, much like Ezra Pound.

== Biography ==
Of Italian ancestry, Lombardo is a native of New Orleans. He has a BA from Loyola University in New Orleans, an MA from Tulane University, and a PhD from the University of Texas (1976). In 1976 he joined the faculty at the University of Kansas, where he served as department chair for fifteen years and taught Greek and Latin at all levels, as well as general courses on Greek literature and culture. He was appointed University of Kansas Honors Program director in 2004.

Lombardo is a Zen master in the Kwan Um School of Zen. Along with his wife, Judith Roitman, who is a retired professor of mathematics at the University of Kansas and a published poet, he was a founding member of the Kansas Zen Center.

== Bibliography ==
- Parmenides and Empedocles (1982) Grey Fox Press. ISBN 978-0-912516-66-0
- Sky Signs: Aratus' Phaenomena (1983) North Atlantic Books. ISBN 978-0-938190-15-8
- Callimachus: Hymns, Epigrams, Select Fragments, with Diane Rayor (1987) Johns Hopkins University Press. ISBN 978-0-8018-3281-9
- Plato: Protagoras (1992) Hackett Publishing Company. ISBN 978-0-87220-094-4
- Hesiod: Works and Days and Theogony (1993) Hackett Publishing Company. ISBN 978-0-87220-179-8
- Lao-Tzu: Tao Te Ching, with Stephen Addiss (1993) Hackett Publishing Company. ISBN 978-0-87220-232-0
- Homer: Iliad (1997) Hackett Publishing Company. ISBN 0-87220-352-2
- Homer: Odyssey (2000) Hackett Publishing Company. ISBN 978-0-87220-485-0
- Sappho: Poems and Fragments (2002) Hackett Publishing Company ISBN 978-0-87220-591-8. Complete Poems and Fragments (2016) Hackett Publishing Company. ISBN 978-1-62466-467-0
- Virgil: Aeneid (2005) Hackett Publishing Company. ISBN 978-0-87220-732-5
- Abelard & Heloise: The Letters and Other Writings, with William Levitan and Barbara Thorburn (2007) Hackett Publishing Company. ISBN 978-0-87220-875-9
- Zen Source Book, with Stephen Addiss and Judith Roitman (2008) Hacket Publishing. ISBN 978-0-87220-909-1
- Dante: Inferno (2008) Hackett Publishing Company. ISBN 978-0-87220-917-6
- Ovid: Metamorphoses (2010) Hackett Publishing Company. ISBN 978-1-60384-308-9
- Statius: Achilleid (2015) Hackett Publishing Company. ISBN 978-1-62466-406-9
- Dante: Purgatorio (2016) Hackett Publishing Company. ISBN 978-1-62466-491-5
- Dante: Paradiso (2017) Hackett Publishing Company. ISBN 978-1-62466-590-5
- Horace: Odes & Carmen Saeculare (2018) Hackett Publishing Company. ISBN 978-1-62466-688-9
- Gilgamesh (2019) Hackett Publishing Company. ISBN 978-1-62466-772-5
- Bhagavad Gita (2019) Hackett Publishing Company. ISBN 978-1-62466-788-6
- Nonnus: Tales of Dionysus, with William Levitan and others (2022) University of Michigan Press. ISBN 978-0-47213-311-6
- Ovid: Heroides, with Melina McClure (2024) Hackett Publishing Company. ISBN 978-1-64792-189-7

=== Audiobooks and Abridgements ===
- The Essential Homer (2000) Hackett Publishing Company. ISBN 978-0-87220-540-6
- The Essential Iliad (2000) Hackett Publishing Company. ISBN 978-0-87220-542-0
- Iliad (2006) (Audiobook) Parmenides Publishing. ISBN 978-1-930972-08-7
- Odyssey (2006) (Audiobook) Parmenides Publishing. ISBN 978-1-930972-06-3
- The Essential Iliad (2006) (Audiobook) Parmenides Publishing. ISBN 978-1-930972-12-4
- The Essential Homer (2006) (Audiobook) Parmenides Publishing. ISBN 978-1-930972-10-0
- The Essential Aeneid (2006) Hackett Publishing Company. ISBN 978-0-87220-791-2
- The Essential Odyssey (2007) Hackett Publishing Company. ISBN 978-0-87220-899-5
- The Essential Metamorphoses (2011) Hackett Publishing Company. ISBN 978-1-60384-624-0

== See also ==
- English translations of Homer § Lombardo

== Sources ==
- Younger, John. "University of Kansas Classics Faculty". Archived from the original on 2006-09-06.
- Hedges, Chris. The Humbling of Odysseus. New York Times Book Review. July 9, 2000.
