= Suzanne Weekes =

American mathematician

Suzanne Louise Weekes
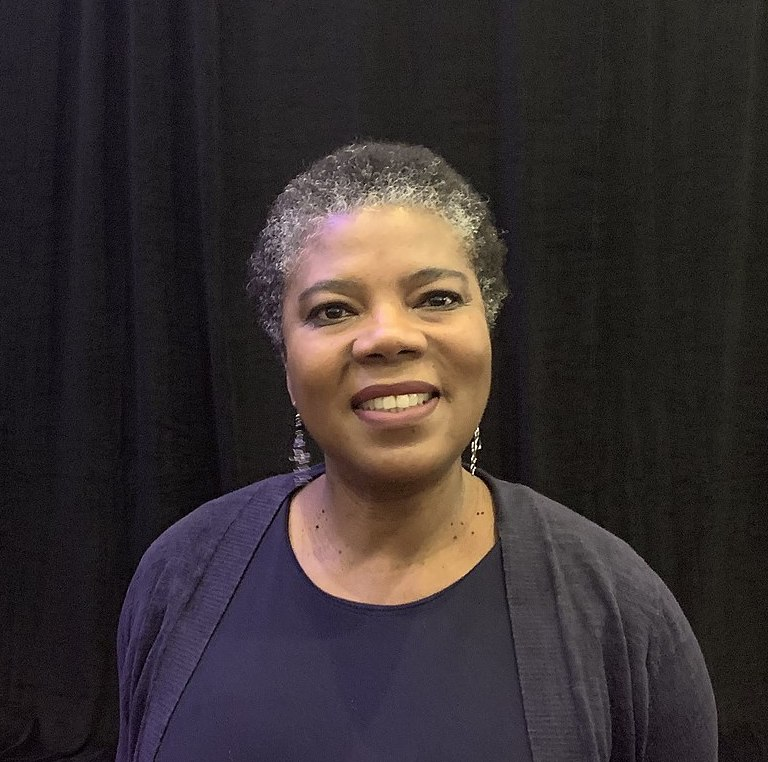
- Education: University of Michigan (Ph.D.); Indiana University Bloomington
- Known for: MSRI Undergraduate Program, PIC Math Program
- Scientific career
- Fields: Mathematics
- Workplaces: Society for Industrial and Applied Mathematics, Worcester Polytechnic Institute
- Thesis: The travelling wave scheme for the Navier-Stokes equations (1995)
- Doctoral advisor: Eduard Harabetian

Suzanne Louise Weekes is the chief executive officer of the Society for Industrial and Applied Mathematics. She is also Professor of Mathematical Sciences at Worcester Polytechnic Institute (WPI). She is a co-founder of the Mathematical Sciences Research Institute Undergraduate Program.

== Education ==
Weekes is Caribbean-American, and was born and raised in Trinidad and Tobago. She graduated in 1989 from Indiana University Bloomington with a major in mathematics and a minor in computer science. She went on to get an MS in applied mathematics in 1990 and a PhD in Mathematics and Scientific Computing in 1995 at the University of Michigan.

== Career ==
Weekes is the co-director of the Preparation for Industrial Careers in Mathematical Sciences, which helps faculty in the U.S. engage their students with Industrial math research. She is a professor of mathematical sciences at Worcester Polytechnic Institute as well as a cofounder of MSRI-UP, a research experience for undergraduates that aims to increase under represented groups in math programs by providing them with research opportunities. In July 2019, she became Interim Associate Dean of Undergraduate Studies at WPI. In December 2019, she was elected to the executive committee of the Association for Women in Mathematics as an at large member.

== Awards and recognition ==
In 2015, Weekes received the Denise Nicoletti Trustees' Award for Service to Community. Weekes was recognized by Mathematically Gifted & Black as a Black History Month 2017 Honoree. She received the 2019 M. Gweneth Humphreys Award for mentorship from the Association for Women in Mathematics. She won one of the Deborah and Franklin Haimo Awards for Distinguished College or University Teaching of Mathematics from the Mathematical Association of America in 2020. She was honored as the 2022 AWM-MAA Etta Zuber Falconer Lecturer. Weekes was selected a Fellow of the Association for Women in Mathematics in the class of 2024 "for her consistent and outstanding support for broadening the participation of women and girls as well as others that are underrepresented in mathematics; for her award-winning teaching and mentoring; and for her vision and success in co-creating and co-directing innovative programs that have improved and diversified the mathematics community." She was named as a Fellow of the American Mathematical Society, in its 2027 class of fellows.
