= Kate Okikiolu =

British mathematician

Kate Adebola Okikiolu
- Born: 1965 (age 60–61)
- Education: University of Cambridge; UCLA
- Awards: Presidential Early Career Award for Scientists and Engineers
- Scientific career
- Fields: Mathematical analysis Elliptic operators
- Workplaces: Princeton University; UCSD; Johns Hopkins University
- Thesis: The Analogue of the Strong Szego Limit Theorem on the Torus and the 3-Sphere (1991)
- Doctoral advisors: Sun-Yung Alice Chang; John B. Garnett

Kate Adebola Okikiolu (born 1965) is a British mathematician. She is known for her work with elliptic differential operators as well as her work with inner-city children.

== Early life and education ==
Okikiolu was born in 1965 in England. Her father was George Olatokunbo Okikiolu, a renowned Nigerian mathematician and the most published black mathematician on record. Her British mother was a high school mathematics teacher. Okikiolu received a B.A. in mathematics from Cambridge University in 1987. In 1991 she earned her Ph.D. in mathematics from the University of California at Los Angeles, for her thesis The Analogue of the Strong Szego Limit Theorem on the Torus and the 3-Sphere.

== Career ==
Based on her PhD work, Okikiolu resolved a conjecture of Peter Wilcox Jones concerning a continuous version of the travelling salesman problem in her paper Characterization of subsets of rectifiable curves in R^{n}. Okikiolu was an instructor and later assistant professor at Princeton University from 1993 to 1995. She then worked as a visiting assistant professor at the Massachusetts Institute of Technology and joined the faculty at the University of California at San Diego in 1995. In 2011 she joined the Mathematics Department at Johns Hopkins University.

She was an invited speaker at the 1996 meeting of the Association of Women in Mathematics. She also delivered the Claytor-Woodard lecture at the 2002 meeting of the National Association of Mathematicians, an organization for African-American mathematicians.

== Honors and awards ==
In 1997, Okikiolu won a Sloan Research Fellowship, becoming the first black recipient of this fellowship. In 1997 she also was awarded a Presidential Early Career Award for Scientists and Engineers for both her mathematical research and her development of mathematics curricula for inner-city school children. This award is given to only 60 scientists and engineers each year and has a prize of $500,000. In 2009, she presented the Etta Z. Falconer Lecture on "The Sum of Squares of Wavelengths of a Closed Surface" an award given by the AWM for women with distinguished careers in mathematics or mathematics education.
