= Kristin Umland =

American mathematician and mathematics educactor

- Occupation: Mathematician
- Awards: Louise Hay Award

Academic background
- Education: University of California, Santa Cruz; University of Illinois Chicago (PhD, 1996)
- Thesis: The Mod-2 Cohomology of the Lyons Group (1996)
- Doctoral advisor: Stephen D. Smith

Kristin Umland is an American mathematician and mathematics educator. She was on the faculty of the Department of Mathematics & Statistics at University of New Mexico in Albuquerque, New Mexico for nearly two decades before leaving to help build the nonprofit organization Illustrative Mathematics (IM).

== Education and career ==
Umland did undergraduate studies at the University of California, Santa Cruz. In 1996, she was awarded a Ph.D. in mathematics by the University of Illinois Chicago. Her dissertation, entitled "The Mod-2 Cohomology of the Lyons Group", was supervised by Stephen D. Smith.

In 1996, Umland began teaching in the Department of Mathematics & Statistics at the University of New Mexico (UNM). She joined the tenure stream faculty in 2002 and was later promoted to associate professor. At New Mexico, Umland taught a wide variety of mathematics courses, ranging from intermediate algebra to measure theory, as well as courses in mathematics education. She supervised 3 doctoral dissertations and several master's dissertations. After being invited to visit the Vermont Mathematics Initiative by Dr. Ken Gross, Umland was set out to improve K–12 teaching and learning.

At UNM, Umland built on her Vermont Mathematics Initiative experience to improve children's learning and achievement. She was program director of La Meta, which was a partnership between the university, Central New Mexico Community College and five New Mexico public school districts. After initially offering mid-grade teachers of mathematics a chance to earn mathematics credit, beginning in 2007, mathematics educators, mathematicians, mentors, and content coaches from the partnership visiting mid-grade classrooms.

Umland worked on an National Science Foundation-funded project to evaluate the impact of Math Teachers' Circles on teachers of middle school mathematics. The circles bring together mathematicians and K–12 mathematics teachers. She and her collaborators reported on the effectiveness of these circles, as well as their history, in the Notices of the American Mathematical Society.

Umland left UNM in 2016 to work full time as vice president for content development at Illustrative Mathematics (IM), a nonprofit company she co-founded with William McCallum to develop and deliver mathematics content for K-12 teachers. She became chief product officer in July 2019. In June of 2020, Umland was appointed as president of IM.

== Recognition ==
In 2017, the American Mathematical Society (AMS) recognized Umland with the AMS Award for Impact on the Teaching and Learning of Mathematics. The AMS cited Umland's work to support the "national K–12 mathematics community in the transition to the Common Core State Standards in Mathematics (CCSS-M)". Umland and IM co-founder William McCallum, together with a community of mathematicians, mathematics educators and teachers developed an open, online resource to assist teachers learn about the core standards and their progression. The award citation reports that "since 2012, illustrativemathematics.org has had over four million visitors viewing tasks over fourteen million times".

In 2018, the Association for Women in Mathematics (AWM) honored Umland with Louise Hay Award "in recognition of her leadership and contributions advancing large-scale improvement in mathematics education". The Louise Hay Awards for Contributions to Mathematics Education were initiated by the AWM in 1991.

== Selected publications ==
- Umland, Kristin (August 1, 2002). College Algebra. Dubuque, IA: Kendall Hunt Pub Co. p. 450. ISBN 978-0787293765.
- Sriraman, Bharath; Umland, Kristin (2020). "Argumentation in Mathematics Education". Encyclopedia of Mathematics Education. Cham: Springer International Publishing. doi:10.1007/978-3-030-15789-0_11. ISBN 978-3-030-15788-3. S2CID 213846344.
- Hill, Heather C.; Umland, Kristin; Litke, Erica; Kapitula, Laura R. (2012). "Teacher Quality and Quality Teaching: Examining the Relationship of a Teacher Assessment to Practice". American Journal of Education. 118 (4). University of Chicago Press: 489–519. doi:10.1086/666380. ISSN 0195-6744. S2CID 54511474.
- Umland, Kristin (2008). "A reflection on mathematical cognition: how far have we come and where are we going?". The Mathematics Enthusiast. 5 (1): 101–116. doi:10.54870/1551-3440.1089. S2CID 118507428.
