= Naomi Fisher =

American mathematician and mathematics educator

Naomi D. Fisher is an American mathematician and mathematics educator and professor emerita of mathematics and computer science at the University of Illinois at Chicago.

== Education and career ==
Fisher did her undergraduate work at Connecticut College for Women (now Connecticut College) and was awarded a B.A. in mathematics from that institution. She received an M.A. in mathematics from the University of Wisconsin, Madison, and a Ph.D. in mathematics education from Northwestern University in 1977. Fisher was a professor in the Department of Mathematics and Computer Science at the University of Illinois at Chicago, served as co-director of the Mathematicians and Education Reform Network (MER) of the Universities of Illinois and Minnesota, and served as the director of the High School Teaching Program for the Regional Geometry Institute (RGI) for the Universities of Illinois Chicago, Texas, Utah, and Washington. She was co-editor of the MER Newsletter.

The Mathematicians and Education Reform Network is a network of research mathematicians who are interested in mathematics education reform in K–12 and the improvement of undergraduate mathematics education. Fisher designed and developed a series of workshops that showcased the significant efforts of research mathematicians in education reform. She conceptualized the Conference Board of the Mathematical Sciences (CBMS) monograph series ISSUES IN MATHEMATICS EDUCATION and was co-editor of four of the first five volumes in that series.

The Regional Geometry Institute (RGI), now the Park City Mathematics Institute, was another avenue to bring together research mathematicians and math educators. Fisher was a founding member of RGI and the primary developer of an agenda that was both rigorous and stimulating for K–12 teachers. The institute was widely praised by participants.

Fisher was active in the Association for Women in Mathematics (AWM). She ran for the position of At-Large Member on the Executive Committee of the AWM in 1993 and joined the Executive Committee in February 1994. The Executive Committee serves as the Board of Directors for the AWM. She served on the Mathematics Association of America (MAA) Committee on Undergraduate Program in Mathematics from 2000 through 2002. She was a co-organizer of AMS-MAA-MER Special Sessions on Mathematics and Education Reform at the Joint Mathematics Meetings in San Antonio, Texas (1999) and Phoenix, Arizona (2004).

== Recognition ==
In 1993, Fisher was presented with Louise Hay Award for Contributions to Mathematics Education by the Association for Women in Mathematics for her ongoing work in mathematics education reform. In 2006, Fisher gave an MAA invited address at the annual Joint Mathematics Meetings in San Antonio, Texas. The title of her talk was "Mathematics and education reform: A cautionary tale".

== Edited volumes ==
- Naomi D. Fisher and Harvey B. Keynes, Philip D. Wagreich (Editors), Mathematicians and Education Reform: Proceedings of the July 6–9, 1988 Workshop (CBMS ISSUES IN MATHEMATICS EDUCATION, Vol. 1) , American Mathematical Society, 1990, Electronic ISBN 978-1-4704-2325-4.
- Naomi D. Fisher and Harvey B. Keynes, Philip D. Wagreich (Editors), Mathematicians and Education Reform 1989–1990 (CBMS ISSUES IN MATHEMATICS EDUCATION, Vol. 2) , American Mathematical Society, 1991, Electronic ISBN 978-1-4704-2326-1.
- Naomi D. Fisher, Harvey B. Keynes, and Philip D. Wagreich (Editors), Mathematicians and Education Reform 1990-1991 (CBMS ISSUES IN MATHEMATICS EDUCATION, Vol. 3) , American Mathematical Society, 1993, Electronic ISBN 978-1-4704-2327-8.
- Naomi D. Fisher, Harvey B. Keynes, and Philip D. Wagreich (Editors), Changing the Culture: Mathematics Education in the Research Community (CBMS ISSUES IN MATHEMATICS EDUCATION, Vol. 5) , American Mathematical Society, 1995, Electronic ISBN 978-1-4704-2329-2.
