= Bozenna Pasik-Duncan =

Polish-American mathematician

- Born: Bożenna Janina Pasik; 1947 (age 78–79)
- Education: University of Warsaw, Main School of Planning and Statistics, Warsaw
- Spouse: Tyrone Duncan
- Scientific career
- Fields: mathematics
- Workplaces: University of Kansas
- Thesis: (1978)

Bozenna Janina Pasik-Duncan (born 1947) is a Polish-American mathematician who works as a professor of mathematics at the University of Kansas.

== Research ==
Pasik-Duncan's research concerns stochastic control and its applications in communications, economics, and health science. She is also interested in mathematics education, particularly for women in STEM fields.

== Education and career ==
Pasik-Duncan attended high school in Radom. She earned a master's degree in mathematics from the University of Warsaw in 1970. She completed a Ph.D. at the Warsaw School of Economics in 1978, and earned a habilitation there in 1986.

She moved to the University of Kansas mathematics department in 1984, joining there her husband Tyrone Duncan (also a University of Kansas mathematician).

== Recognition ==
She was a recipient of the IEEE's Third Millennium Medal in 2000, and became a Fellow of the IEEE in 2001. She was the 2004 AWM/MAA Falconer Lecturer, and the 2004 winner of the Louise Hay Award for Contributions to Mathematics Education of the Association for Women in Mathematics. She was named a Fellow of the International Federation of Automatic Control in 2014. Pasik-Duncan was selected as a Fellow of the Association for Women in Mathematics in the Class of 2021 "for her decades of contributions: as a founder and sustainer of the Women in Control Committee of the IEEE Control Systems Society; as the chair of IFAC’s Task Force on Diversity and Inclusion; and via other programs and activities to support and encourage women and girls in mathematics and engineering".
