= Olga Beaver =

Czech-American mathematician (1942–2012)

Olga Rozinak Beaver
- Born: November 12, 1942; Prague, Czechoslovakia
- Died: December 7, 2012 (aged 70)
- Education: University of Missouri – Kansas City, University of Massachusetts Amherst
- Known for: Summer Science Program at Williams College
- Children: 2
- Scientific career
- Fields: Mathematics
- Workplaces: Williams College
- Doctoral advisor: Thurlow Adrean Cook

Olga Beaver (12 November 1942 – 7 December 2012), informally called Ollie, was a Czech-American mathematician and Professor of Mathematics at Williams College. She was the recipient of the second Louise Hay Award from the Association for Women in Mathematics. She is noted for having founded the Summer Science Program at Williams. She served as the director of the SSP for many years, and was the chair of the Mathematics Department at Williams for five and a half years.

== Early life ==
Beaver was born in Prague, Czechoslovakia to Ing. Achill Jozef Roziňák and Zora Marie (Lisa) Roziňáková on 12 November 1942. Her earliest memory was of hiding in her apartment basement during a bombing raid. After attending schools in Prague, she fled with her family at night to West Germany in 1949. She lived in refugee camps in Munich, and then in London for two years and nine months, where she witnessed the coronation of Elizabeth II. She to the United States in 1952 and spent the rest of her childhood in Long Island. or their family came only in 1957, when they are documented in the Ellis Island list of immigrants

== Education ==
Beaver began her undergraduate education at Smith College; while still enrolled, she married Donald deBlasiis (Don) Beaver. She left the college in 1962 when she became pregnant. She began taking classes at Southern Connecticut State College. After her husband finished his Ph.D. in 1966, the family moved to Kansas City, Missouri, where Olga continued her work on her bachelor's degree at the University of Missouri–Kansas City, completing her bachelor's in 1968 and her master's in 1969 (also at UMKC). She was a mathematics professor at Williams College from 1 July 1971 until her death. In 1972, Beaver enrolled in the Ph.D. program at University of Massachusetts Amherst. She earned her doctorate from UMass in 1979, in the mathematics of quantum logic. She pursued research in measure theory and probability theory.

Beaver died of stage 4 metastatic breast cancer on 7 December 2012 at her home, having been diagnosed with breast cancer in September 2009. However, she continued teaching until 9 November 2012. At the time of her death, she had been a member of the American Mathematical Society for 36 years.

== Personal life ==
Beaver enjoyed teaching mathematics, cooking, gardening, reading, and interior design. She traveled to Prague biannually since 1992, and was pleased to have her Czech citizenship reinstated. She had two children and five grandchildren.

== Awards and honors ==
Beaver was honored with the 2nd Louise Hay Award in 1992.
