= Louise Hay (disambiguation) =

Louise Hay (born 1926) is an American motivational author.

Louise Hay may also refer to:

- Louise Hay (mathematician) (1935–1989), French-born American mathematician
- Louise Linton (born 1980), Scottish actress, born as Louise Hay
