= Lynda Wiest =

American mathematics education researcher

Lynda R. Wiest is an American mathematics education researcher and professor at the University of Nevada, Reno.

== Research ==
Wiest investigates mathematics education, educational equity, and teacher education.

== Education ==
Wiest earned her B.S. degree in 1979 and her M.Ed. degree in 1984, both from Bloomsburg University of Pennsylvania. After teaching elementary and middle school students for eleven years in Pennsylvania, she earned her Ph.D. at Indiana University Bloomington in 1996. Her Ph.D. advisor was Frank Klein Lester, Jr., and her dissertation title is The Role of Fantasy and Real-World Problem Contexts in Fourth- and Sixth-Grade Students' Mathematical Problem Solving.

== Career ==
In 1996, Wiest joined the faculty at the University of Nevada, Reno in the College of Education. She earned tenure and was promoted to Associate Professor in 2001, and she was promoted to Professor in 2009.

In 1998, Wiest founded the Northern Nevada Girls Math and Technology Program.

== Awards and honors ==
In 2021, Wiest received the Association for Women in Mathematics (AWM) Louise Hay Award for "contribut[ing] impactfully to advancing mathematics education in K-12 across a variety of school settings. She has created innovative courses and summer programs, addressing gender equity and diversity issues." She received the Women in Leadership STEM Award, from the Girl Scouts of the Sierra Nevada in 2015. She earned the F. Donald Tibbitts Distinguished Teacher Award from the University of Nevada, Reno in 2015. She won the Nevada Regent’s Academic Advisor Award (graduate level) in 2003.
