= Etta Zuber Falconer =

African American mathematician (1933–2002)

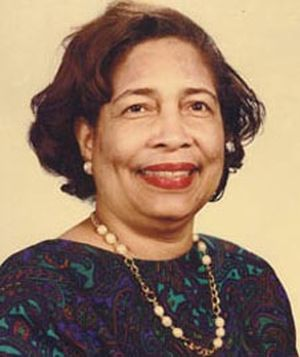
- Born: November 21, 1933; Tupelo, Mississippi, US
- Died: September 19, 2002 (aged 68); Atlanta, Georgia, US

Academic background
- Education: Fisk University; University of Wisconsin; Emory University
- Thesis: Quasigroup identities invariant under isotopy (1969)
- Doctoral advisor: Trevor Evans

Academic work
- Discipline: Mathematics
- Institutions: Okolona College; Howard School of Academics and Technology; Spelman College; Norfolk State University

Etta Zuber Falconer (November 21, 1933 – September 19, 2002) was an American educator and mathematician the bulk of whose career was spent at Spelman College, where she eventually served as department head and associate provost. She was one of the earlier African-American women to receive a Ph.D. in mathematics.

== Family ==
Etta Zuber was born in Tupelo, Mississippi, to Walter A. Zuber, a physician, and Zadie L. Montgomery Zuber, a musician. The Zubers had two daughters, with Etta being the younger and Alice the older. While teaching at Okolona Junior College in Okolona, Mississippi, Etta met and married Dolan Falconer, a basketball coach. They had three children – Dolan Falconer Jr., who became a nuclear engineer; Alice Falconer Wilson, a pediatrician; and Walter Zuber Falconer, a urologist. The couple's marriage lasted over 35 years, ending in 1994 with Dolan's death.

== Education ==
Etta Falconer attended the Tupelo public school system, graduating from Carver High School in 1949.

At the age of 15 she entered Fisk University in Nashville, Tennessee, where she majored in mathematics and minored in chemistry, graduating summa cum laude in 1953. While at Fisk, Falconer was inducted into the Phi Beta Kappa academic honor society. Her teachers included the talented mathematician Evelyn Granville, one of the first African American women to receive a doctoral degree in mathematics.

She went on to study at the University of Wisconsin, where she earned a Master of Science degree in mathematics in 1954. Lonely in Wisconsin, she decided not to pursue her doctorate there and returned to Mississippi to teach. In 1965, by which time she had married, changed her name to Etta Falconer, and started teaching at Spelman College in Atlanta, she entered graduate school at Emory University where she earned a Ph.D. in mathematics (1969), with a dissertation on quasigroup theory supervised by Trevor Evans. She later published two research papers based on her dissertation work, one of which was published in 1971 by the Hungarian Academy of Sciences.

To assist in setting up a computer science department while mathematics department head at Spelman College, she returned to graduate school at Atlanta University, earning a Master of Science degree in computer science in 1982.

== Teaching career ==
Falconer began her teaching career in 1954 at Okolona College, where she met and married Dolan Falconer. She remained at Okolona until 1963, when she accepted a position at Howard High School in Chattanooga, Tennessee, where she taught the academic year 1963–64. When her husband was offered a coaching position at Morris Brown College in 1965, the family moved to Atlanta, also the site of Spelman College, an historically black women's college.

Falconer's mother had studied at Spelman, and Falconer approached the head of the mathematics department, telling him that she wanted to teach there. She was appointed an instructor in 1965. In 1969 Falconer became the eleventh African American woman to receive a PhD in mathematics. She specialized in abstract algebra. Falconer advanced to associate professor, leaving Spelman in 1971 to join the mathematics department at Norfolk State University, where she taught for the academic year 1971–1972. Falconer returned to Spelman as professor of mathematics and head of the mathematics department. She held those positions until 1985.

Falconer devoted 37 years of her life to teaching mathematics and improving science education at Spelman College. In 1995, she stated: "My entire career has been devoted to increasing the number of African American women in mathematics and mathematics-related careers." Along with her teaching career, Falconer strived to inspire more African American women to pursue careers in math or science by working with prominent organizations. This included the American Mathematical Society, the Mathematical Association of America, the Association for Women in Mathematics, and the National Institute of Science.

== Awards and recognition ==
Falconer was awarded the UNCF Distinguished Faculty Award (1986–1987), the Spelman Presidential Award for Excellence in Teaching (1988), and the Spelman Presidential Faculty Award for Distinguished Service (1994). In 1995, Falconer was honored by the Association for Women in Mathematics, who awarded her the Louise Hay Award for outstanding achievements in mathematics education. She also received QEM's Giants in Science Award (1995), and an honorary doctorate of science from the University of Wisconsin-Madison (1996). She was named a Fellow of the American Association for the Advancement of Science in 1999. In 2001, she received the American Association for the Advancement of Science Mentor Award for Lifetime Achievement.

== Death ==
Falconer died of pancreatic cancer on September 19, 2002, in Atlanta, Georgia, at the age of sixty-eight. The AWM/MAA Falconer Lecture was renamed in her honor.
