= Rachel Justine Pries =

American mathematician

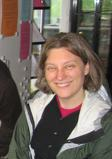
- Pries in 2007
- Education: Brown University; University of Pennsylvania
- Awards: Fellow, American Mathematical Society, 2018
- Scientific career
- Fields: Mathematics
- Workplaces: Columbia University; Colorado State University
- Thesis: Formal patching and deformation of wildly ramified covers of curves (2000)
- Doctoral advisor: David Harbater
- Website: http://www.math.colostate.edu/~pries/

Rachel Justine Pries is an American mathematician whose research focuses on arithmetic geometry and number theory. She is a professor at Colorado State University and both a Fellow of the American Mathematical Society and a Fellow of the Association for Women in Mathematics.

== Education ==
Pries was a student at the Cambridge Rindge and Latin School, in Cambridge, Massachusetts. She received a B.S. degree from Brown University in Providence, Rhode Island in 1994, and received a Ph.D. in mathematics from the University of Pennsylvania in Philadelphia, Pennsylvania in 2000 under the supervision of David Harbater.

== Career and research ==
After her doctoral studies, Pries was appointed a National Science Foundation VIGRE post-doctoral fellow at Columbia University for 2000 to 2003. After her post-doc at Columbia, Rachel joined the faculty at Colorado State University, Fort Collins, Colorado, where she is currently a full professor.

In one of her most cited works, Families of wildly ramified covers of curves, Pries studied smooth Galois covers of curves, ramified over only one point. In a second highly cited paper, Hyperelliptic curves with prescribed p-torsion, Pries and co-author Darren Glass, proved several results regarding the existence of Jacobian varieties having interesting p-torsion as measured in terms of invariants such as the p-rank and the a-number.

Pries serves on the Steering Committee of Women in Number Theory (WIN), a research collaboration community for women mathematicians interested in number theory. She was an editor of Directions in Number Theory: Proceedings of the 2014 WIN3 Workshop (Association for Women in Mathematics Series), which was published by Springer Verlag in 2016.

== Honors ==
Pries was elected to the 2018 class of fellows of the American Mathematical Society. Her citation read "for contributions to arithmetic geometry, and for service to the mathematical community." Pries was selected as the inaugural lecturer in the Association for Women in Mathematics Distinguished Lecture Series at the University of Oregon, Eugene, Oregon, in 2013. In 2004, Pries was selected as Outstanding Professor in Graduate Instruction by the mathematics graduate students of Colorado State University Pries was elected to the 2023 class of fellows of the Association for Women in Mathematics "for supporting the research careers of women through mentorship and advocacy; for her vision and hard work establishing the Women in Numbers workshops and research network; and for broadening the participation of women in mathematics through service and leadership both at her institution and in high-profile national and international programs."
