= Martha K. Smith =

American mathematics educator

- Occupation: Professor Emerita

Academic background
- Education: University of Michigan (BA) University of Chicago (MS, PhD)
- Thesis: Group Algebras (1970)
- Doctoral advisor: Israel Nathan Herstein

Academic work
- Discipline: Mathematics and mathematics education
- Sub-discipline: Non-commutative algebra, statistics
- Institutions: Rice University Washington University University of Texas at Austin

Martha K. Smith is an American mathematician and mathematics educator. She is a Professor Emerita in the Department of Mathematics and Associated Faculty (Emerita) of the Department of Statistics and Data Science at the University of Texas at Austin. She has made contributions to non-commutative algebra as well as to mathematics education.

== Education and career ==
Smith received a B.A. in mathematics (summa cum laude) from the University of Michigan in 1965, a M.S. in mathematics in 1967, and a Ph.D. in mathematics in 1970, both from the University of Chicago. Her dissertation "Group Algebras" was supervised by Israel Nathan Herstein.

After completing her doctoral studies, Smith became a G.C. Evans Instructor of Mathematics at Rice University in Houston, Texas, where she remained from 1970–1972. She joined the faculty of the Department of Mathematics at Washington University in St. Louis in St. Louis, Missouri in 1972 as an assistant professor. She began her long career at the University of Texas at Austin in 1973 as an Assistant Professor of mathematics. She was promoted to Associate Professor in 1976 and to Professor in 1985. She retired in 2009 and became Professor Emerita of mathematics in 2019. In the late 1990s, Smith became interested in statistics and taught statistics even after she retired.

In the late 1980s, the Texas legislature abolished mathematics education degrees and it became the responsibility of collegiate mathematics departments to prepare future K–12 teachers of mathematics. Smith took on this responsibility at the University of Texas at Austin. Smith used a variety of teaching methods as well bringing technology, group work, and writing projects into the curriculum before these techniques were in vogue. She held the belief that even the weakest student is capable of learning.

In the late 1970s, Smith served on the AMS-ASA-MAA-SIAM Data Committee, which is responsible for preparing the Annual Survey of the profession. She served on various committees of the American Mathematical Society (AMS) and the Mathematical Association of America (MAA) as well as serving as a referee for numerous journals and National Science Foundation panels. In 2011, Smith was a panelist for the AWM Hay Minisymposium Panel on the mathematical education of teachers and the Common Core at the Joint Mathematics Meetings in New Orleans, Louisiana.

== Recognition ==
In Spring 1993, Smith received a Department of Mathematics Teaching Award at the University of Texas at Austin.

In 1994, Smith received the Dad's Association Centennial Teaching Fellowship at the University of Texas at Austin.

In 1999, Smith was selected by the Association for Women in Mathematics to receive the Louise Hay Award for Contributions to Mathematics Education "in recognition of her very significant contributions to mathematics education and her outstanding achievements as a teacher and scholar".

== Edited collections ==
James W. Brewer and Martha K. Smith, Emmy Noether: A Tribute to Her Life and Work, Marcel Dekker, Monographs and Textbooks in Pure and Applied Mathematics Vol. 69, 1981, ISBN 978-0-8247-1550-2.

S. Montgomery, M.K. Smith et al., Selected Papers on Algebra, Mathematical Association of America, The Raymond W. Brink Selected Mathematical Papers Vol. 3, 1977, ISBN 978-0-8838-5203-3.
