= Sybilla Beckmann =

American mathematician

- Title: Josiah Meigs Distinguished Teaching Professor of Mathematics
- Awards: Louise Hay Award

Academic background
- Education: University of Pennsylvania; Brown University
- Thesis: Fields of Definition of Solvable Branched Coverings (1986)
- Doctoral advisor: David Harbater

Academic work
- Discipline: Mathematics
- Institutions: University of Georgia; Yale University
- Main interests: Mathematical cognition Mathematical education of teachers Mathematics content for grades pre-K - 8

Sybilla Beckmann is a Josiah Meigs Distinguished Teaching Professor of Mathematics, Emeritus, at the University of Georgia and a recipient of the Association for Women in Mathematics Louise Hay Award.

== Biography ==
Sybilla Beckmann received her Sc.B. in Mathematics from Brown University in 1980 and her Ph.D. in Mathematics from the University of Pennsylvania under the supervision of David Harbater in 1986. She taught at Yale University as a J.W. Gibbs Instructor of Mathematics, before becoming a Josiah Meigs Distinguished Teaching Professor of Mathematics at the University of Georgia. She retired in 2020.

Beckmann's main interests include mathematical cognition, mathematical education of teachers, and mathematics content for pre-Kindergarten through Grade 8.

== Publications ==
Beckmann's publications include the following.

- Mathematics for Elementary Teachers: Making Sense by "Explaining Why", in Proceedings of the Second International Conference on the Teaching of Mathematics at the Undergraduate Level, J. Wiley & Sons, Inc., (2002).
- What mathematicians should know about teaching math for elementary teachers. Mathematicians and Education Reform Newsletter, Spring 2004. Volume 16, number 2.
- Solving Algebra and Other Story Problems with Simple Diagrams: a Method Demonstrated in Grade 4 – 6 Texts Used in Singapore, The Mathematics Educator, 14, (1), pp. 42 – 46 (2004).
- With Karen Fuson. Focal Points: Grades 5 and 6. Teaching Children Mathematics. May 2008. Volume 14, issue 9, pages 508 – 517.
- Focus in Grade 5, Teaching with Curriculum Focal Points. (2009). National Council of Teachers of Mathematics. This book elaborates on the Focal Points at grade 5, including discussions of the necessary foundations at grades 3 and 4.
- Thomas J. Cooney, Sybilla Beckmann, and Gwendolyn M. Lloyd. (2010). Developing Essential Understanding of Functions for Teaching Mathematics in Grades 9 – 12. National Council of Teachers of Mathematics.
- Karen C. Fuson, Douglas Clements, and Sybilla Beckmann. (2010). Focus in Prekindergarten: Teaching with Curriculum Focal Points. National Council of Teachers of Mathematics.
- Karen C. Fuson, Douglas Clements, and Sybilla Beckmann. (2010). Focus in Kindergarten: Teaching with Curriculum Focal Points. National Council of Teachers of Mathematics.
- Karen C. Fuson, Douglas Clements, and Sybilla Beckmann. (2010). Focus in Grade 1: Teaching with Curriculum Focal Points. National Council of Teachers of Mathematics.
- Karen C. Fuson, Douglas Clements, and Sybilla Beckmann. (2011). Focus in Grade 2: Teaching with Curriculum Focal Points. National Council of Teachers of Mathematics.
- Fuson, K. C. & Beckmann, S. (Fall/Winter, 2012–2013). Standard algorithms in the Common Core State Standards. National Council of Supervisors of Mathematics Journal of Mathematics Education Leadership, 14 (2), 14–30.
- Mathematics for Elementary Teachers with Activities, 4th edition, published by Pearson Education, copyright 2014, publication date January 2013.
- Beckmann, S., & Izsák, A. (2014). Variable parts: A new perspective on proportional relationships and linear functions. In Nicol, C., Liljedahl, P., Oesterle, S., & Allan, D. (Eds.) Proceedings of the Joint Meeting of Thirty-Eighth Conference of the International meeting of the Psychology of Mathematics Education and the Thirty-Sixth meeting of the North American Chapter of the International Group for the Psychology of Mathematics Education, Vol. 2, pp. 113–120. Vancouver, Canada: PME.
- Beckmann, S. & Izsák, A. (2014). Why is slope hard to teach? American Mathematical Society Blog on Teaching and Learning Mathematics.
- Beckmann, S., & Izsák, A. (2015). Two perspectives on proportional relationships: Extending complementary origins of multiplication in terms of quantities. Journal for Research in Mathematics Education 46(1), pp. 17–38.
- Beckmann, S., Izsák, A., & Ölmez, İ. B. (2015). From multiplication to proportional relationships. In X. Sun, B. Kaur, J. Novotna (Eds.), Conference proceedings of ICMI Study 23: Primary mathematics study on whole numbers, pp. 518 – 525. Macau, China: University of Macau.

== Awards ==
- Association for Women in Mathematics twenty-fourth annual Louise Hay Award (2014).
- Mathematical Association of America fourth annual Mary P. Dolciani Award (2015).
