= Katherine Puckett Layton =

American mathematics educator

Katherine Puckett Layton is an American mathematics educator and the author of mathematics textbooks.

== Education and career ==
Layton received a bachelor's degree in mathematics from the University of California at Los Angeles (UCLA) and later obtained a master's degree in education from Harvard University. In 1960, shortly after graduating from UCLA, Layton began her long teaching career at Beverly Hills High School in Beverly Hills, California. During the seventies, Layton served as chair of the mathematics department and was involved with the students both in the classroom and through Mu Alpha Theta, the honor society for high schools and two-year colleges. Layton served as visiting lecturer at Clemson University in Clemson, South Carolina and from 1986–1987, in the UCLA mathematics department. After retiring from Beverly Hills High School in 1999. Layton served two years as a distinguishe educator at the UCLA Graduate School of Education.

Layton made two trips to China to evaluate educational efforts in that country. Findings of the second trip were presented at the convention of the National Council of Teachers of Mathematics (NCTM) at the Cervantes Convention Center in St. Louis, Missouri; Layton was one of the panelists that presented the conclusions of the envoy. Layton was a member of the National Board of Professional Teaching Standards in 1989, when they began planning to issue teaching certificates to qualified teachers. The program was designed to measure "expertise in 29 areas ranging from childhood development to foreign languages".

Layton, a longtime member of the NCTM, was an invited speaker of more than 22 annual meetings and numerous regional meetings. She served on several committees of the Mathematical Association of America (MAA) and was an invited speaker at six annual MAA meetings. In addition to serving on the board of the National Board of Professional Teaching Standards, Layton served as a member of the National Board for Professional Teaching Standards, the College Entrance Examination Board, and the Mathematical Science Education Board.

== Recognition ==
In 1990, Layton was honored for exemplary teaching with the Presidential Award for Teaching Excellence. The award is sponsored by the National Science Foundation and honors two science and two mathematics teachers from each state in the U.S. In 2003, the Association for Women in Mathematics (AWM) recognized Layton for "her significant contributions to mathematics education, her outstanding achievements as a teacher and scholar, and her role in bridging mathematics education communities" by selecting her to receive the 2003 Louise Hay Award for Contributions to Mathematics Education. In that same year, Layton was chosen as the AWM/MAA Falconer Lecturer; the title of her lecture was "What I Learned in Forty Years in Beverly Hills 90212". The Etta Z. Falconer Lecture, which includes both the lecture and an award, honors "women who have made distinguished contributions to the mathematical sciences or mathematics education".

== Selected books ==
- Kreisel, Joan; Layton, Katherine P. (1990). Fearon's Basic Mathematics. The Pacemaker Curriculum (1st ed.). Belmont, California: Fearon Education. p. 354. ISBN 9780822408086.
- Travers, Kenneth J.; Dalton, LeRoy C.; Layton, Katherine P. (June 1987). Laidlaw Algebra 1. Laidlaw Educational Publisher. ISBN 9780844518381.
- Travers, Kenneth J.; Dalton, LeRoy C.; Layton, Katherine P. (1990). Glencoe Algebra 2 with Trigonometry. Mission Hills, California: Glencoe. p. 691. ISBN 9780026507387.
- Travers, Kenneth J.; Dalton, LeRoy C.; Layton, Katherine P. (1987). Geometry. River Forest, Illinois: Laidlaw Brothers. p. 646. ISBN 9780844518435.
