= Association for Women in Mathematics Newsletter =

Membership magazine

- Discipline: Mathematics
- Language: English
- Edited by: Anne Leggett

Publication details
- History: 1971–present
- Publisher: Association for Women in Mathematics (United States)
- Frequency: Bimonthly
- Open access: yes

Standard abbreviations
- ISO 4: Assoc. Women Math. Newsl.

Indexing
- OCLC no.: 45770674

Links
- Journal homepage

Association for Women in Mathematics Newsletter is the membership journal of the Association for Women in Mathematics (AWM) and is published bimonthly. The inaugural issue appeared in May 1971, a few months after the AWM began. The first editor was Mary W. Gray, who was also the first "chairman" of the AWM. Gray was succeeded as editor by Alice T. Schafer, who also took over as president. Schafer edited a few issues and Judith Roitman succeeded her; Roitman later became the fourth AWM president. In 1977, Anne Leggett was appointed editor, a position which she retains to this day.

The AWM Newsletter is sent, by request, to all regular members of the AWM. It is currently an open access journal and all issues are available at its website. As described in "A Brief History of the Association for Women in Mathematics: The President's Perspectives," by third AWM president Lenore Blum:

The Newsletter has since become the very embodiment of the AWM. From the start, it was our forum for discussing the role of women in mathematics, for exposing discrimination, for exchanging strategies, encouraging political action and affirmative actions, for informing, supporting, honoring, and of course, for job listings (which first appeared in the February 1972 issue). It has been our key linkage with each other, with credit due largely to Mary and subsequent editors, Judy Roitman and Anne Leggett.

Each issue contains the "President's Report," announcements of prizes and awards given to women, notices of upcoming meetings and workshops, several columns (Book Review, Education, Media and others), as well as "In Memoriam" articles. There is an archive of all past issues of the AWM Newsletter available as pdf files. Associate editor Sarah J. Greenwald created a searchable database, with the help of the migration specialist at Appalachian State University.
