= AWM/MAA Falconer Lecture =

U.S. lecture series in science and math

The Etta Z. Falconer Lecture is an award and lecture series which honors "women who have made distinguished contributions to the mathematical sciences or mathematics education". It is sponsored by the Association for Women in Mathematics and the Mathematical Association of America. The lectures began in 1996 and were named after the mathematician Etta Z. Falconer in 2004 "in memory of Falconer's profound vision and accomplishments in enhancing the movement of minorities and women into scientific careers". The recipient presents the lecture at MathFest each summer.

== Recipients ==
The Falconer Lecturers have been:

- 1996 Karen E. Smith, MIT, "Calculus mod p"
- 1997 Suzanne M. Lenhart, University of Tennessee, "Applications of Optimal Control to Various Population Models"
- 1998 Margaret H. Wright, Bell Labs, "The Interior-Point Revolution in Constrained Optimization"
- 1999 Chuu-Lian Terng, Northeastern University, "Geometry and Visualization of Surfaces"
- 2000 Audrey Terras, University of California at San Diego, "Finite Quantum Chaos"
- 2001 Pat Shure, University of Michigan, "The Scholarship of Learning and Teaching: A Look Back and a Look Ahead"
- 2002 Annie Selden, Tennessee Technological University, "Two Research Traditions Separated by a Common Subject: Mathematics and Mathematics Education"
- 2003 Katherine Puckett Layton, Beverly Hills High School, "What I Learned in Forty Years in Beverly Hills 90212"
- 2004 Bozenna Pasik-Duncan, University of Kansas "Mathematics Education of Tomorrow"
- 2005 Fern Hunt, National Institute of Standards and Technology, "Techniques for Visualizing Frequency Patterns in DNA"
- 2006 Trachette Jackson, University of Michigan, "Cancer Modeling: From the Classical to the Contemporary"
- 2007 Katherine St. John, City University of New York, "Comparing Evolutionary Trees"
- 2008 Rebecca Goldin, George Mason University, "The Use and Abuse of Statistics in the Media"
- 2009 Kathleen Adebola Okikiolu, "The Sum of Squares of Wavelengths of a Closed Surface"
- 2010 Ami Radunskaya, Pomona College, "Mathematical Challenges in the Treatment of Cancer"
- 2011 Dawn Lott, Delaware State University, "Mathematical Interventions for Aneurysm Treatment"
- 2012 Karen D. King, National Council of Teachers of Mathematics, "Because I Love Mathematics: The Role of Disciplinary Grounding in Mathematics Education"
- 2013 Patricia Clark Kenschaft, Montclair State University,"Improving Equity and Education: Why and How"
- 2014 Marie A. Vitulli, University of Oregon, "From Algebraic to Weak Subintegral Extensions in Algebra and Geometry"
- 2015 Erica N. Walker, Teachers College, Columbia University, "'A Multiplicity All at Once': Mathematics for Everyone, Everywhere"
- 2016 Izabella Laba, University of British Columbia, "Harmonic Analysis and Additive Combinatorics on Fractals"
- 2017 Talithia Williams, Harvey Mudd College, "Not So Hidden Figures: Unveiling Mathematical Talent"
- 2018 Pamela Gorkin, Bucknell University, "Finding Ellipses"
- 2019 Tara Holm, Cornell University, "Dance of the Astonished Topologist... or How I Left Squares and Hexes for Math"
- 2020 MathFest and Falconer Lecture canceled due to COVID-19 pandemic
- 2021 Bonita V. Saunders, National Institute of Standards and Technology, “Complex Functions, Mesh Generation, and Hidden Figures in the NIST Digital Library of Mathematical Functions”
- 2022 Suzanne Weekes, Executive Director of the Society for Industrial and Applied Mathematics (SIAM), "Continuity at Interfaces"
- 2023 Tatiana Toro, University of Washington and Director of SLMath, "Geometry of Measures"
- 2024 Deanna Needell, University of California, Los Angeles, "Towards Fairer-ness in Machine Learning”
- 2025 Olivia Feldman, University of Tennessee, "Mathematical Insights at Different Biological Scales."
- 2026 Christina Edholm, Scripps College,"Bridging the Gap with Mathematical Modeling"

== See also ==
- Kovalevsky Lecture
- Noether Lecture
- List of mathematics awards
