= Trevor Evans (mathematician) =

British and American mathematician (1925–1991)

Trevor Evans (1925–1991) was a mathematician specializing in abstract algebra, finite geometry, and the word problem. Originally British, he worked for many years in the US.

== Early life and education ==
Evans was born on December 22, 1925, in Wolverhampton. He read mathematics at the University of Oxford, receiving a bachelor's degree in 1946. After a 1948 master's degree from the University of Manchester, he returned to Oxford for a master's degree in 1950 and a doctorate (D.Sc.) in 1960. His doctorate was granted based on 12 previous publications rather than on a dissertation; it was jointly advised by Graham Higman and Philip Hall.

== Career and later life ==
From 1946 to 1950, Evans was an assistant lecturer at the University of Manchester. He moved to the US in 1950. After becoming an instructor at the University of Wisconsin–Madison in 1950, he took a faculty position at Emory University in 1951. He remained at Emory for the rest of his career, despite several other visiting positions: he joined the Institute for Advanced Study in 1952, and became a research associate at the University of Chicago in 1953. Later he visited the University of Nebraska, the California Institute of Technology, and the Darmstadt University of Technology in Germany.

He headed the mathematics department at Emory from 1963 until 1978, and was given the Fuller E. Callaway Professorship of Mathematics in 1980. His notable students included Etta Zuber Falconer, who completed her doctorate under his supervision in 1969.

== Awards ==
Emory University gave Evans their 1972 Emory Williams Distinguished Teaching Award for Graduate Education. He was also a recipient of the distinguished service award of the Southeastern Section of the Mathematical Association of America.

An undergraduate award, the Trevor Evans Award, is given in memory of Evans by the Emory University Department of Mathematics. Another award with the same name, the Trevor Evans Award, is given annually by the Mathematical Association of America for an outstanding publication in its undergraduate mathematics magazine, Math Horizons.

== Selected publications ==
=== Research articles ===
- Evans, Trevor (1951), "On multiplicative systems defined by generators and relations, I: Normal form theorems", Proceedings of the Cambridge Philosophical Society, 47: 637–649, doi:10.1017/S0305004100027092, MR 0043764
- Evans, Trevor (1960), "Embedding incomplete latin squares", American Mathematical Monthly, 67 (10): 958–961, doi:10.2307/2309221, JSTOR 2309221, MR 0122728
- Evans, Trevor (1969), "Some connections between residual finiteness, finite embeddability and the word problem", Journal of the London Mathematical Society, Second Series, 1: 399–403, doi:10.1112/jlms/s2-1.1.399, MR 0249344
- Evans, Trevor (1971), "The lattice of semigroup varieties", Semigroup Forum, 2 (1): 1–43, doi:10.1007/BF02572269, MR 0284528

=== Surveys ===
- Evans, Trevor (1978), "Word problems", Bulletin of the American Mathematical Society, 84 (5): 789–802, doi:10.1090/S0002-9904-1978-14516-9, MR 0498063

=== Books ===
- Evans, Trevor (1959), Fundamentals Of Mathematics, Prentice-Hall
- Lindner, Charles C.; Evans, Trevor (1977), Finite embedding theorems for partial designs and algebras, Séminaire de Mathématiques Supérieures [Seminar on Higher Mathematics], vol. 56, Les Presses de l'Université de Montréal, MR 0460213
