= Gordon Lafer =

American economist

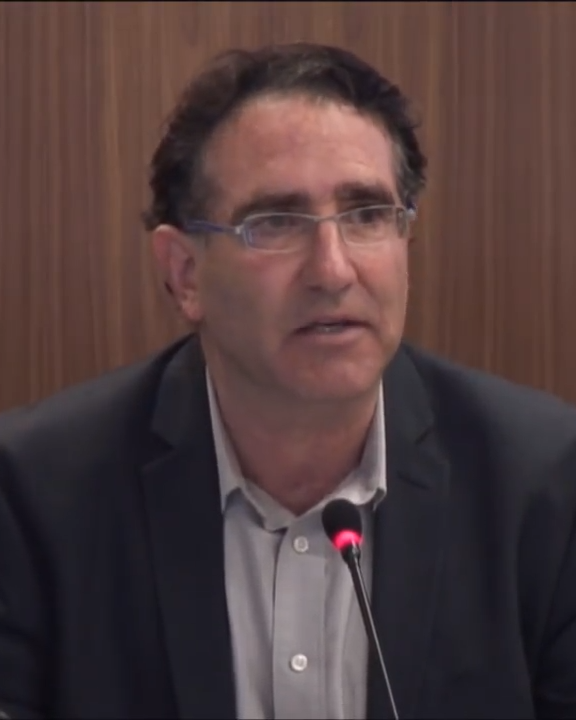
- Lafer in 2017
- Born: March 1960 (age 66)
- Education: PhD Political Science, Yale University, 1995 B.A., Economics, Swarthmore College, 1983
- Occupations: Political economist, writer
- Notable work: The Job Training Charade

Gordon Lafer is a political economist writer who has served as Senior Labor Policy Advisor for the U.S. House of Representatives' Committee on Education and Labor and has a history of Labor Union activism. He has written widely on labor and employment policy issues and is the author of the books The Job Training Charade and The One Percent Solution.

He is currently a professor in the Labor Education & Research Center at the University of Oregon and a research associate of the Economic Policy Institute.

== Biography ==
Gordon Lafer started his political work as an economic policy analyst in the Office of the Mayor in New York City under Mayor Ed Koch.

He was one of the leaders of the Graduate Employees and Students Organization at Yale, which was on strike several times in the 1990s.

Lafer served as Research and Communications Director for the Federation of University Employees at Yale.

He ran a hotel workers' campaign with the International Longshore and Warehouse Union, Local 142, in Hawaii, and wrote about the campaign in the magazine Dissent.

At the University of Oregon, Lafer and mathematician Marie A. Vitulli led an effort to unionize faculty at the University of Oregon beginning in the spring of 2007. This effort eventually led to the formation of the United Academics at the University of Oregon.

He worked for ILWU Local 142, helping coordinate the boycott of the Pacific Beach Hotel, which was found guilty of multiple labor law violations in federal court. After a ten-year struggle, the hotel unionized in 2013.

Lafer has served as Senior Labor Policy Advisor for the U.S. House of Representatives' Committee on Education and the Workforce, a position that made him the top congressional staff member responsible for upholding labor standards in international trade treaties, and he has been called to testify as an expert witness before multiple state legislatures. He was the primary Congressional staff person responsible for the Local Jobs for America Act, a bill that would have created one million decently-paid jobs and restored essential public services that were cut during the Great Recession. The bill was introduced by Rep. George Miller (D-CA), chair of the United States House Committee on Education and the Workforce, but never became law.

Lafer is a member of the Scholars' Advisory Council of in the Public Interest, a research and policy center promoting democratic control of public goods and services.

He is the founding co-chair of the American Political Science Association's Labor Project, and serves on the board of directors of the Shalom Hartman Institute, a pluralistic center of research and education deepening and elevating the quality of Jewish life in Israel and around the world.

As of 2023, Lafer was Vice Chair of the Eugene School District Board of Directors, to which he was elected in 2019. His term expired June 30, 2023, as he lost his campaign for reelection in the May 16, 2023 Special District Election.

== Works ==
Lafer is the author of the books The Job Training Charade and The One Percent Solution: How Corporations Are Remaking America One State at a Time.

Lafer's work has appeared in The Nation and U.S. News & World Report and has been featured in The Washington Post, The New York Times, Fortune magazine, and other publications.
