= Marcia Groszek =

American mathematician

Marcia Jean Groszek is an American mathematician whose research concerns mathematical logic, set theory, forcing, and recursion theory. She is a professor of mathematics at Dartmouth College.

== Education ==
As a high school student, Groszek felt isolated for her interest in mathematics, but she found a sense of community through her participation in the Hampshire College Summer Mathematics Program, and she went on to earn her bachelor's degree at Hampshire College. She completed her Ph.D. in 1981 at Harvard University. Her dissertation, Iterated Perfect Set Forcing and Degrees of Constructibility, was supervised by Akihiro Kanamori.

== Research ==
With Theodore Slaman, Groszek showed that (if they exist at all) non-constructible real numbers must be widespread, in the sense that every perfect set contains one of them, and they asked analogous questions of the non-computable real numbers.^{[C]} With Slaman, she has also shown that the existence of a maximally independent set of Turing degrees, of cardinality less than the cardinality of the continuum, is independent of ZFC.^{[A]}

In the theory of ordinal definable sets, an unordered pair of sets is said to be a Groszek–Laver pair if the pair is ordinal definable but neither of its two elements is; this concept is named for Groszek and Richard Laver, who observed the existence of such pairs in certain models of set theory.^{[B]}

== Service and outreach ==
Groszek was program chair of the 2014 North American annual meeting of the Association for Symbolic Logic. Her interest in logic extends to education as well as to research; she has participated in the Association for Symbolic Logic Committee on Logic Education, and in 2011 she was co-organizer of an Association for Symbolic Logic special session on "Logic in the Undergraduate Mathematics Curriculum". With mathematics colleague Dorothy Wallace and performance artist Josh Kornbluth, Groszek has also helped write and produce a sequence of educational videos about mathematics.

== Selected publications ==
A.	Groszek, Marcia J.; Slaman, Theodore A. (1983), "Independence results on the global structure of the Turing degrees", Transactions of the American Mathematical Society, 277 (2): 579–588, doi:10.2307/1999225, JSTOR 1999225, MR 0694377

B.	Groszek, M.; Laver, R. (1987), "Finite groups of OD-conjugates", Periodica Mathematica Hungarica, 18 (2): 87–97, doi:10.1007/BF01896284, MR 0895774, S2CID 120945893

C.	Groszek, Marcia J.; Slaman, Theodore A. (1998), "A basis theorem for perfect sets", The Bulletin of Symbolic Logic, 4 (2): 204–209, CiteSeerX 10.1.1.32.5166, doi:10.2307/421023, JSTOR 421023, MR 1632148, S2CID 26705447
