= Annie Selden =

American mathematics educator

Annie Laurer Alexander Selden is an expert in mathematics education. She is a professor emeritus at Tennessee Technological University, and an adjunct professor at New Mexico State University. She was one of the original founders of the Association for Women in Mathematics in 1971.

== Education ==
Born as Annie Louise Laurer, she graduated from Oberlin College in 1959, learned to program computers in a summer job at IBM in Endicott, New York, and traveled to the University of Göttingen to study mathematics as a Fulbright scholar. With the support of the Woodrow Wilson Foundation, she earned a master's degree from Yale University in 1962. Delayed by marriage and two children, she completed her Ph.D. from Clarkson University in 1974. She published her dissertation, Bisimple ω-semigroups in the locally compact setting, under the name Annie Laurer Alexander. It was supervised by John Selden Jr., whom she later married as her second husband.

== Career ==
Although Selden originally intended to be a research mathematician, the job market at the time of her graduation led her to teach abroad, and the experience of teaching mathematics to non-native English speakers led her to become interested in mathematics education. She taught at the State University of New York at Potsdam, Hampden–Sydney College, Boğaziçi University in Turkey, and Bayero University Kano in Nigeria, before joining Tennessee Technological University in 1985. She retired and moved to New Mexico in 2003.

== Awards and honors ==
In 2002, Selden was the winner of the Louise Hay Award of the Association for Women in Mathematics, and the AWM/MAA Falconer Lecturer. She was elected as a fellow of the American Association for the Advancement of Science in 2003. The Annie and John Selden Prize of the Mathematical Association of America is named after Selden and her husband.
