= Katherine St. John =

Computer scientist

- Scientific career
- Fields: Computer science
- Workplaces: CUNY Graduate Center; Lehman College

Katherine St. John is a professor at the CUNY Graduate Center Department of Computer Science and at Lehman College Department of Mathematics and Computer Science. She is a faculty member at the New York Consortium in Evolutionary Primatology. In 2007 she was selected to be an AWM/MAA Falconer Lecturer where she gave a presentation on "Comparing Evolutionary Trees". She is also a former American Mathematical Society Council member at large.
