= Louise Hay (mathematician) =

French-born American mathematician

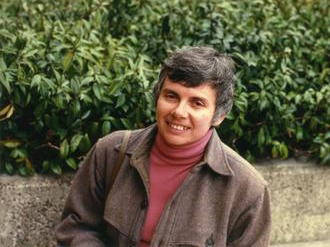
- Louise Hay in December 1986
- Born: Louise Szmir; June 14, 1935; Metz, Lorraine, France
- Died: 28 October 1989 (aged 54); Oak Park, Illinois
- Other names: Louise Schmir Hay; Louise Larson
- Occupation: Mathematician
- Years active: 1960–1989
- Spouses: John Hay (m. 1955; div. 1968) Richard Larson (m. 1970)

Louise Hay (June 14, 1935 – October 28, 1989) was a French-born American mathematician. Her work focused on recursively enumerable sets and computational complexity theory, which was influential with both Soviet and US mathematicians in the 1970s. When she was appointed head of the mathematics department at the University of Illinois at Chicago, she was the only woman to head a math department at a major research university in her era.

== Biography ==
Louise Schmir was born in Metz, Lorraine, France, on 14 June 1935 to Marjem (née Szafran) and Samuel Szmir. Her mother died in 1938. Of Polish-Jewish heritage, the family fled the Nazis, moving to Switzerland in 1944 and then moving again to New York City, in 1946, where they Anglicized their surname to Schmir. She attended William Howard Taft High School in the Bronx and won a Westinghouse Science Talent Search award during her senior year. Graduating as valedictorian of her high school, Schmir enrolled in Swarthmore College.

In 1955, at the end of her junior year, she married John Hay, and then completed her BA in mathematics in 1956. She began her master's studies at Cornell University, where her husband was studying and when he transferred to Oberlin College, she followed him there. Though she completed her work on mathematical logic at Oberlin, her master's degree was awarded by Cornell in 1959. Her master's thesis was entitled "An Axiomatization of the Infinitely Many-Valued Predicate Calculus." She taught for a year at Oberlin and then worked at the Cornell Aeronautical Laboratory in Buffalo, New York.

When her husband relocated to Boston, she followed him there and worked at Mount Holyoke College for three years. In 1963, after the birth of her first son, she returned to Cornell to work on her doctorate. Twin sons were born to the couple in 1964. She was awarded a PhD in 1965; her doctorate thesis was on co-simple isols and was an advance in the Dekker-Myhil-Nerode theory on recursive equivalence types. In 1966 she was awarded a National Science Foundation Fellowship and conducted research at MIT between 1966 and 1968. In 1968, Hay divorced and moved to Chicago, accepting an associate professorship at the University of Illinois. In 1970, she married fellow mathematician Richard Larson, was diagnosed with breast cancer in 1974 and in 1975 was promoted to full professor. She published prolifically throughout the 1970s on recursively enumerable sets and introduced the concept of the "weak jump," a generalization of the Halting problem distinct from the usual notion of the Turing jump. She also proved analogues of the Rice and Rice-Shapiro theorems, as well as working on theories of computational complexity theory.

Her work was influential with both Soviet and US mathematicians of the period. She co-founded the Association for Women in Mathematics (AWM) in an effort to provide support to other working mothers. In 1978, she won a Fulbright Scholarship, as did her husband, and they spent the year studying in the Philippines. In 1979, Hay was named the acting head of the University of Illinois' mathematics department, becoming the only woman to head a research university's mathematics department. In 1980, she was appointed to the executive board of the AWM and remained in that post until 1987. She was also named as secretary of the Association for Symbolic Logic in 1982.

== Death and legacy ==
In 1988, Hay had a relapse in her breast cancer but continued to work until her death on 28 October 1989 in Oak Park, Illinois. In 1990 the AWM established the Louise Hay Award for Contributions to Mathematics Education to both honor Hay for her contributions to mathematical logic, her leadership and recognize a woman who had made contributions to mathematics and education.

== Bibliography ==
- Hay, Louise Schmir (1959). An axiomatization of the infinitely many-valued predicate calculus. Ithaca, New York: Cornell University.
- Oakes, Elizabeth H. (2007). Encyclopedia of World Scientists. New York, New York: Infobase Publishing. ISBN 978-1-4381-1882-6.
- Soare, Robert I. (January–February 1990). "In Memoriam: Louise Hay 1935–1989" (PDF). Association for Women in Mathematics Newsletter. 20 (1). Wellesley, Massachusetts: Wellesley College.

== Additional sources ==
- Hay, Louise. How I became a mathematician, Newsletter of the Association for Women in Mathematics, 1989 (pp. 8–10).
- Hughes, Rhonda. Fond Remembrances of Louise Hay, Newsletter of the Association for Women in Mathematics, 1990, (pp. 4–6).
