= Patricia Campbell =

American mathematician

- Education: College of St. Francis; Michigan State University; Florida State University (PhD)
- Scientific career
- Workplaces: University of Maryland, College Park
- Thesis: The role of pictures in first-grade children's perception of mathematical relationships

Patricia F. Campbell is an American mathematician and mathematics educator. She is a professor in the Department of Teaching and Learning, Policy and Leadership at the University of Maryland, College Park. Her work has concerned the improvement of mathematics education in minority and lower-income secondary schools, and the effectiveness of mathematics coaching in mathematics education.

Campbell is a graduate of the College of St. Francis. After earning a master's degree in mathematics at Michigan State University, she completed a Ph.D. in mathematics education at the Florida State University. She was co-chair of the American Educational Research Association Special Interest Group on Research in Math Education for 2007–2009.

In 2011 she was given the Twenty-First Annual Louise Hay Award for Contributions to Mathematics Education. The Association for Women in Mathematics awarded it to her "for her contributions to the teaching and learning of mathematics in urban settings and for working in schools that serve predominantly minority populations from low-income backgrounds".
