= Louise Hay Award =

Mathematics award issued by the Association for Women in Mathematics

- Description: Mathematics award recognizing outstanding contributions as a math educator
- Country: United States
- Presented by: Association for Women in Mathematics
- Website: https://awm-math.org/awards/hay-award/

The Louise Hay Award is a mathematics award planned in 1990 and first issued in 1991 by the Association for Women in Mathematics in recognition of contributions as a math educator. The award was created in honor of Louise Hay.

== Recipients ==
The following women have been honored with the Hay Award:

Year	Recipient
2026	Gerunda Hughes
2025	Pamela E. Harris
2024	Trena Wilkerson
2023	Nicole M. Joseph
2022	Vilma Mesa
2021	Lynda Wiest
2020	Erika Camacho
2019	Jacqueline Dewar
2018	Kristin Umland
2017	Cathy Kessel
2016	Judy L. Walker
2015	T. Christine Stevens
2014	Sybilla Beckmann
2013	Amy Cohen
2012	Bonnie Gold
2011	Patricia Campbell
2010	Phyllis Chinn
2009	Deborah Loewenberg Ball
2008	Harriet Pollatsek
2007	Virginia Warfield
2006	Patricia Clark Kenschaft
2005	Susanna Epp
2004	Bozenna Pasik-Duncan
2003	Katherine Puckett Layton
2002	Annie Selden
2001	Patricia D. Shure
2000	Joan Ferrini-Mundy
1999	Martha K. Smith
1998	Deborah Hughes Hallett
1997	Marilyn Burns
1996	Glenda Lappan and Judith Roitman
1995	Etta Falconer
1994	Kaye A. de Ruiz
1993	Naomi Fisher
1992	Olga Beaver
1991	Shirley Frye

== See also ==
- List of mathematics awards
