= James Samuel Windeatt =

Photographer (1861–1944)

James Samuel Windeatt (1861–1944) was a photographer known for his images of celebrities including theatrical performers in Chicago. Born in Plymouth, England, he apprenticed with court photography studio the Downey Bros. and then emigrated to the U.S. He worked in Max Platz' studio until the photographer's death in 1894 when Windeatt partnered with Joseph W. Gehrig for a few years. He then established his own studio, first in Chicago and then in the suburb of Oak Park.

He was married to Augusta Windeatt and had three daughters. Prominent people he photographed include Chauncey Olcott, Viola Allen, Patricia Campbell, Margaret Illington, Vesta Tilley, Roselle Knott, Otis Skinner, and Gertrude Norman.

== Gallery ==
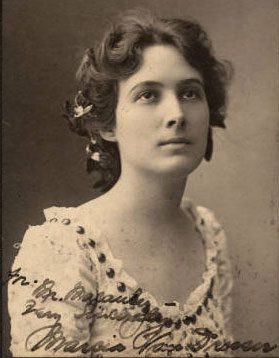
Marcia Van Dresser

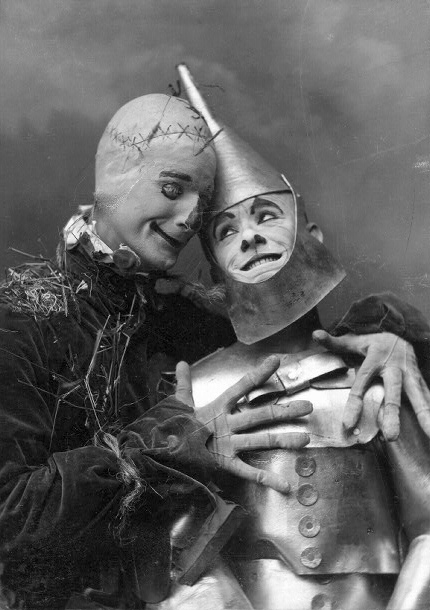
Fred Stone and David C. Montgomery in The Wizard of Oz

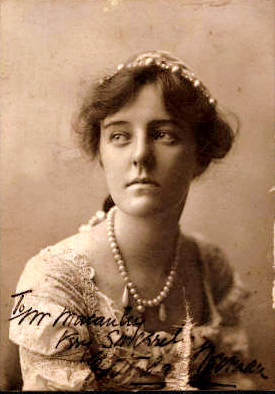
Gertrude Norman
