= Patricia Clark Kenschaft =

American mathematician

Patricia Clark Kenschaft (March 25, 1940 – November 20, 2022) was an American mathematician. She was a professor of mathematics at Montclair State University. She is known as an author of books on mathematics, as a founder of PRIMES, the Project for Resourceful Instruction of Mathematics in the Elementary School, and for her work for equity and diversity in mathematics.

== Early life, education and career ==
Kenschaft was born in 1940 to political activist and history teacher Bertha Francis Clark and organic chemist John Randolph Clark. The family lived in Nutley.

The eldest of four children, Kenschaft took on a nurturing in the household. Her brother, Bruce, was born with cognitive disabilities. This led to her mother and family becoming advocates for special education and state income taxes to better support school systems.

Kenschaft graduated from Swarthmore College in 1961, earning a bachelor's degree with honors in mathematics and with minors in English, philosophy, and education. She earned a master's degree from the University of Pennsylvania in 1963, and then returned to the University of Pennsylvania for doctoral studies, completing a Ph.D. in 1973, while in the same period raising a child and founding a nursery school in Concord, Massachusetts. Her dissertation, in functional analysis, was Homogeneous $C^*$-Algebras over $S^n$, and was supervised by Edward Effros.

After working in adjunct positions at St. Elizabeth's College and Bloomfield College, she joined the Montclair State faculty in 1973, and was promoted to full professor in 1988. She retired in 2005 and died in 2022.

== Service to the profession ==
Kenschaft became the founding president of the New Jersey Association for Women in Mathematics in 1981 and of the New Jersey Faculty Forum in 1988. She chaired the Committee on Participation of Women of the Mathematical Association of America (MAA) from 1987 to 1993, the Committee on Mathematics and the Environment of the MAA from 2000 to 2004, and the Equity and Diversity Integration Task Force of the National Council of Teachers of Mathematics in 2003. She served as director of several projects to improve mathematics education in public schools, including PRIMES (Project for Resourceful Instruction of Mathematics in the Elementary School). Kenschaft hosted a live weekly radio talk show called "Math Medley" from 1998 - 2004.

== Books ==
Kenschaft was the author of:

- Calculus: A Practical Approach (with Kenneth Kalmanson, Worth, 1975)
- Childbirth, Cooperative Style: Family Experience with Prepared Childbirth and Prenatal Classes (Exposition Press, 1977)
- Linear Mathematics: A Practical Approach (Worth, 1978)
- Mathematics: A Practical Approach (with Kenneth Kalmanson, Worth, 1978)
- Math Power: How to Help Your Child Love Math Even If You Don’t (Addison-Wesley, 1997; Dover, 2014)
- Mathematics for Human Survival (Whitter, 2002)
- Change Is Possible: Stories of Women and Minorities in Mathematics (American Mathematical Society, 2005)

Additionally, she edited

- Winning Women into Mathematics (Mathematical Association of America, 1991)
- Environmental Mathematics in the Classroom (with Ben Fusaro, Mathematical Association of America, 2003)

== Recognition ==
Kenschaft was the 2006 winner of the Louise Hay Award of the Association for Women in Mathematics "in recognition of her long career of dedicated service to mathematics and mathematics education" and for her work "writing about, speaking about, and working for mathematics and mathematics education in the areas of K–12 education, the environment, affirmative action and equity, and public awareness of the importance of mathematics in society".

In 2012, she received the Sr. Stephanie Sloyan Distinguished Service Award from the New Jersey section of the Mathematical Association of America.

She was the 2013 Falconer Lecturer of the Association for Women in Mathematics and Mathematical Association of America, speaking on "Improving Equity and Education: Why and How".

Kenshaft was selected a Fellow of the Association for Women in Mathematics in the Class of 2021 "for almost 50 years of sustained and lasting commitment to the advancement of underrepresented groups in the mathematical sciences, especially girls, women, and African Americans. Her extensive service, publications, and outreach bring to light racism, sexism, and inequities, always delivered with the message that positive change is possible".
