= Suzanne Lenhart =

American mathematician (born 1954)

Suzanne Marie Lenhart
- Born: Suzanne Marie Lenhart; November 19, 1954 (age 72)
- Education: Bellarmine College; University of Kentucky
- Scientific career
- Fields: Mathematics
- Workplaces: University of Tennessee
- Thesis: Partial Differential Equations from Dynamic Programming Equations (1981)
- Doctoral advisor: Lawrence Craig Evans

Suzanne Marie Lenhart (born November 19, 1954) is an American mathematician who works in partial differential equations, optimal control and mathematical biology. She is a Chancellor's Professor of mathematics at the University of Tennessee, an associate director for education and outreach at the National Institute for Mathematical and Biological Synthesis, and a part-time researcher at the Oak Ridge National Laboratory.

== Education and career ==
Lenhart grew up in Louisville, Kentucky, and was educated in the Catholic school system there. She did her undergraduate studies at Bellarmine College in Louisville, where Ralph Grimaldi encouraged her to prepare for graduate studies in mathematics and gave her additional tutoring in number theory. She entered graduate school at the University of Kentucky not knowing what she would specialize in, but in her second year chose partial differential equations. She completed her doctorate in 1981 under the supervision of Lawrence C. Evans, and immediately took a tenure-track faculty position at the University of Tennessee. She added a second part-time position at Oak Ridge in 1987.

== Awards and honors ==
Lenhart was AWM/MAA Falconer Lecturer in 1997, president of the Association for Women in Mathematics in 2001–2003, and AWM/SIAM Sonia Kovalevsky Lecturer in 2010 "in recognition of her significant research in partial differential equations, ordinary differential equations, and optimal control". She was elected as a fellow of the American Association for the Advancement of Science (AAAS) in 2010, and became a Chancellor's Professor and SIAM Fellow in 2011. In 2013, she was selected as a fellow of the American Mathematical Society (AMS) in the inaugural class. In 2017, she was selected as a fellow of the Association for Women in Mathematics in the inaugural class. In 2022, Lenhart was invited as an AAAS-AMS address selection committee member. In 2026, she was elected as a fellow of the Resource Modeling Association for "sustained leadership and service to the advancement of the scientific approach to conservation and natural resource management." Professor Lenhart is the society's 9th fellow in its 50-year history.

== Selected publications ==
Textbooks

- Lenhart, Suzanne; Workman, John T. (2007), Optimal Control Applied to Biological Models, Chapman & Hall/CRC Mathematical and Computational Biology Series, Chapman & Hall/CRC, Boca Raton, FL, ISBN 978-1-58488-640-2.
- Bodine, Erin N.; Lenhart, Suzanne; Gross, Louis J. (2014), Mathematics for the Life Sciences, Princeton University Press, ISBN 9781400852772

Research papers

- Lenhart, Suzanne M.; Travis, Curtis C. (1986), "Global stability of a biological model with time delay", Proceedings of the American Mathematical Society, 96 (1): 75–78, doi:10.2307/2045656, JSTOR 2045656, MR 0813814.
- Kirschner, Denise; Lenhart, Suzanne; Serbin, Steve (1997), "Optimal control of the chemotherapy of HIV", Journal of Mathematical Biology, 35 (7): 775–792, doi:10.1007/s002850050076, MR 1479338, PMID 9269736, S2CID 6128548.
- Fister, K. Renee; Lenhart, Suzanne; McNally, Joseph Scott (1998), "Optimizing chemotherapy in an HIV model", Electronic Journal of Differential Equations: No. 32, 12, MR 1657195.
- Jung, E.; Lenhart, S.; Feng, Z. (2002), "Optimal control of treatments in a two-strain tuberculosis model", Discrete and Continuous Dynamical Systems, 2 (4): 473–482, doi:10.3934/dcdsb.2002.2.473, MR 1921233.
