= Audrey Terras =

American mathematician (born 1942)

- Born: Audrey Bowdoin; September 10, 1942 (age 83); Washington, D.C.
- Education: University of Maryland, College Park (BS); Yale University (MA, PhD)
- Awards: Fellow of the AAAS; Noether Lecturer; AWM/MAA Falconer Lecturer
- Scientific career
- Fields: Mathematics
- Workplaces: University of California San Diego
- Doctoral advisor: Tsuneo Tamagawa
- Doctoral students: Dorothy Wallace

Audrey Anne Terras (born September 10, 1942) is an American mathematician who works primarily in number theory. Her research has focused on quantum chaos and on various types of zeta functions.

== Early life and education ==
Audrey Terras was born September 10, 1942, in Washington, D.C. She received a BS degree in mathematics from the University of Maryland, College Park (UMD) in 1964, and MA and PhD degrees from Yale University in 1966 and 1970 respectively. She was married to fellow UMD alumnus Riho Terras. She stated in a 2008 interview that she chose to study mathematics because "The U.S. government paid me! And not much! It was the time of Sputnik, so we needed to produce more mathematicians, and when I was deciding between Math and History, they weren’t paying me to do history, they were paying me to do math."

== Career ==
Terras joined the University of California, San Diego, as an assistant professor in 1972, and became a full professor there in 1983. She retired in 2010, and currently holds the title of Professor Emerita.

As an undergraduate Terras was inspired by her teacher Sigekatu Kuroda to become a number theorist; she was especially interested in the use of analytic techniques to get algebraic results. Today her research interests are in number theory, harmonic analysis on symmetric spaces and finite groups, special functions, algebraic graph theory, zeta functions of graphs, arithmetical quantum chaos, and the Selberg trace formula.

== Recognition ==
Terras was elected a Fellow of the American Association for the Advancement of Science in 1982. She was the Association for Women in Mathematics- Mathematical Association of America AWM/MAA Falconer Lecturer in 2000, speaking on "Finite Quantum Chaos," and the AWM's Noether Lecturer in 2008, speaking on "Fun with Zeta Functions of Graphs". In 2012 she became a fellow of the American Mathematical Society. She is part of the 2019 class of fellows of the Association for Women in Mathematics.

== Selected publications ==
- Terras, Audrey (1985). Harmonic Analysis on Symmetric Spaces and Applications. Vol. 1. Berlin: Springer-Verlag. ISBN 978-0-387-96159-0.
- Terras, Audrey (1988). Harmonic Analysis on Symmetric Spaces and Applications. Vol. 2. Berlin: Springer-Verlag. ISBN 978-0-387-96663-2.
- Terras, Audrey (1999). Fourier Analysis on Finite Groups and Applications. Cambridge: Cambridge University Press. ISBN 978-0-521-45718-7.
- Terras, Audrey (February 2002). "Finite Quantum Chaos". American Mathematical Monthly. 109 (2). Washington, DC: Mathematical Association of America: 121–139. doi:10.2307/2695325. ISSN 0002-9890. JSTOR 2695325. Article based on her 2000 Falconer lecture.
- Terras, Audrey (2007-03-20). "A Stroll Through the Garden of Graph Zeta Functions" (PDF). University of California, San Diego. Draft of a book on zeta functions of graphs.
