= Gloria Olive =

Academic mathematician from New Zealand

- Born: 8 June 1923; New York City
- Died: 17 April 2006 (aged 82); Dunedin, New Zealand
- Scientific career
- Fields: Mathematics. Combinatorics
- Institutions: University of Otago

Gloria Olive (8 June 1923 – 17 April 2006) was a New Zealand academic mathematician.

== Academic career ==
Olive began her mathematics career in the United States. She graduated with a BA from Brooklyn College in 1944 followed by an MA from the University of Wisconsin in 1946 and a PhD from the University of Oregon in 1950, with the dissertation Generalised Powers.

In 1972 she took up a teaching position at the University of Otago. She became Senior Lecturer in Mathematics. She retired in December 1988 and died in Dunedin in 2006.

== Contributions ==
Olive was one of a small group of approximately 7 women who established the precursor group to the Association for Women in Mathematics.

She is the author of the book Mathematics for Liberal Arts Students (Macmillan, 1973).

She also published several papers on the "generalized powers" of her dissertation. These are formed from the Gaussian binomial coefficients in an analogous way to the expansion of powers by the binomial theorem. However, she was unable to prove her conjecture that the zeros of these polynomials all have unit magnitude.
