= Dorothy Wallace =

American mathematician

Dorothy Irene Wallace Andreoli is an American number theorist, mathematical biologist, and mathematics educator. She is a professor of mathematics at Dartmouth College.

== Education ==
Wallace is a graduate of Yale University. She completed her Ph.D. in 1982 at the University of California, San Diego. Her dissertation, Selberg's Trace Formula and Units in Higher Degree Number Fields, concerned number theory and was supervised by Audrey Terras.

== Contributions ==
Wallace is the author or co-author of books including:

- Applications of Calculus to Biology and Medicine: Case Studies from Lake Victoria (with Nathan Ryan, World Scientific, 2017)
- The Bell That Rings Light: A Primer in Quantum Mechanics and Chemical Bonding (with Joseph BelBruno, World Scientific, 2006)

With art curator Kathy Hart, Wallace co-curated the exhibit "Visual Proof: the Experience of Mathematics in Art" at Dartmouth's Hood Museum of Art in 1999. With mathematics colleague Marcia Groszek and performance artist Josh Kornbluth, Wallace has also helped write and produce a sequence of educational videos about mathematics.

== Recognition ==
Wallace was named New Hampshire CASE Professor of the Year in 2000. In 2019 the Dartmouth Alumni Association gave Wallace their Rassias Award for educational outreach to alumni, for her 15 years of work giving mathematics lectures on Dartmouth alumni travel excursions.
