= Barbara Keyfitz =

Canadian-American mathematician

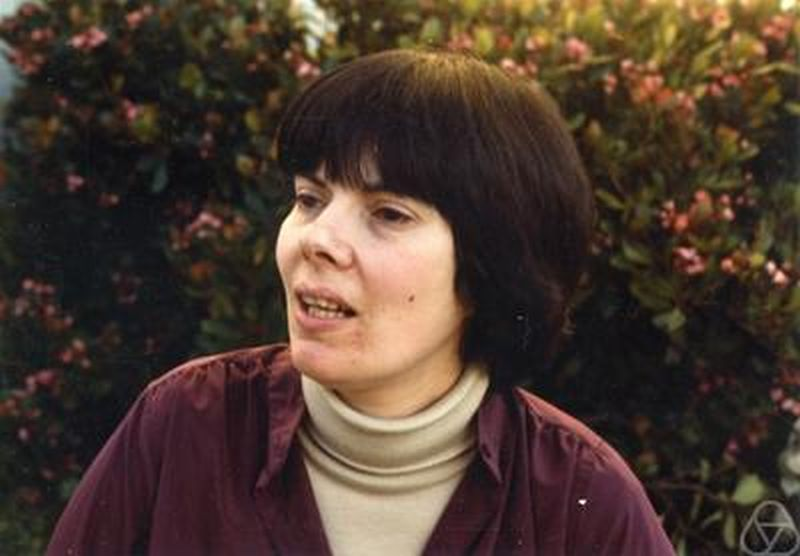
- Keyfitz in 1982
- Title: Professor
- Awards: Krieger–Nelson Prize, SIAM Prize for Distinguished Service to the Profession

Academic background
- Education: New York University
- Doctoral advisor: Peter Lax

Academic work
- Discipline: Mathematics
- Institutions: Ohio State University; Columbia University; Princeton University; Arizona State University; University of Houston

Barbara Lee Keyfitz is a Canadian-American mathematician, formerly the Dr. Charles Saltzer Professor of Mathematics at Ohio State University. In her research, she studies nonlinear partial differential equations and associated conservation laws.

== Professional career ==
Keyfitz did her undergraduate studies at the University of Toronto, and earned a Ph.D. in 1970 from New York University, under the supervision of Peter Lax. Before taking her present position at Ohio State, she taught at Columbia University, Princeton University, Arizona State University, and the University of Houston; at Houston, she was the John and Rebecca Moores Professor of Mathematics. She was also the director of the Fields Institute from 2004 to 2008.

She was president of the Association for Women in Mathematics from 2005 to 2006, and in 2011 she became president of the International Council for Industrial and Applied Mathematics. She was Vice-President of the American Mathematical Society from 2011 - 2014.

== Awards and honors ==
Keyfitz is the 2005 winner of the Krieger–Nelson Prize of the Canadian Mathematical Society, the 2011 Noether Lecturer of the Association for Women in Mathematics, the 2012 winner of the SIAM Prize for Distinguished Service to the Profession, and the 2012 AWM-SIAM Sonia Kovalevsky Lecturer. She was interviewed by Patricia Clark Kenschaft in her book Change is Possible:Stories of Women and Minorities in Mathematics.

In 2012 she became a fellow of the American Mathematical Society. She is also a fellow of the American Association for the Advancement of Science, the Society for Industrial and Applied Mathematics and the Fields Institute.

In 2017, she was selected as a fellow of the Association for Women in Mathematics in the inaugural class.

== Publications ==
=== Books edited ===
- B. L. Keyfitz and H. C. Kranzer, eds., Nonstrictly Hyperbolic Conservation Laws, Contemporary Mathematics, 60, American Mathematical Society, Providence, 1987.
- B. L. Keyfitz and M. Shearer, eds., Nonlinear Evolution Equations that Change Type, IMA Series Volume 27, Springer Verlag, 1990.

=== Book chapter ===
- B. L. Keyfitz, 'Hold that Light! Modeling of Traffic Flow by Differential Equations', in Six Themes on Variations, (R. Hardt and R. Forman, eds), American Mathematical Society, 2005.

=== Selected publications in refereed journals ===
- B. L. Keyfitz, 'Solutions with shocks: an example of an L1 contractive semi-group', Comm. Pure Appl. Math. XXIV, (1971), 125-132.
- B. L. Keyfitz, R. E. Melnik and B. Grossman, 'An analysis of the leading-edge singularity in transonic small-disturbance theory', Quarterly Journal of Mechanics and Applied Mathematics, XXXI, (1978), 137-155.
- B. L. Keyfitz and H. C. Kranzer, 'Existence and uniqueness of entropy solutions to the Riemann problem for hyperbolic systems of two nonlinear conservation laws', Journal of Differential Equations, 27, (1978), 444-476.
- B. L. Keyfitz and H. C. Kranzer, 'The Riemann problem for a class of hyperbolic conservation laws exhibiting a parabolic degeneracy', Journal of Differential Equations, 47, (1983), 35-65.
- B. L. Keyfitz, 'Classification of one state variable bifurcation problems up to codimension seven', Dynamics and Stability of Systems, 1, (1986), 1-41.
- B. L. Keyfitz and G. G. Warnecke, `The existence of viscous profiles for transonic shocks', Communications in Partial Differential Equations, 16, (1991) 1197-1221.
- B. L. Keyfitz, 'A geometric theory of conservation laws which change type', Zeitschrift fur Angewandte Mathematik und Mechanik, 75, (1995), 571-581.
- B. L. Keyfitz and N. Keyfitz, 'The McKendrick Partial Differential Equation and its Uses in Epidemiology and Population Study', Mathematical and Computer Modelling, 26, (1997), 1-9.
- B. L. Keyfitz, 'Self-Similar Solutions of Two-Dimensional Conservation Laws', Journal of Hyperbolic Differential Equations, 1 (2004), 445-492.
- B. L. Keyfitz, 'The Fichera Function and Nonlinear Equations', Rendiconti Accademia delle Scienze detta dei XL, Memorie di Matematica e Applicazioni, XXX (2006), 83-94.
- B. L. Keyfitz, 'Singular Shocks: Retrospective and Prospective', Confluentes Mathematici, 3 (2011), 445-470.
- J. Holmes, B. L. Keyfitz and F. Tiglay, 'Nonuniform dependence on initial data for compressible gas dynamics: The Cauchy problem on R2', SIAM Journal of Mathematical Analysis, 50 (2018), 1237-1254.

== Personal ==
Keyfitz was born in Ottawa, and is the daughter of Canadian demographer Nathan Keyfitz. She is married to Marty Golubitsky and has two children.
