= Cathy Kessel =

American mathematician

Cathy Kessel is a U.S. researcher in mathematics education and consultant, past-president of Association for Women in Mathematics, winner of the Association for Women in Mathematics Louise Hay Award, and a blogger on Mathematics and Education. She served as an editor for Illustrative Mathematics from the end of 2015 through July 15, 2017.

== Biography ==
Kessel received her Ph.D. in mathematics from the University of Colorado Boulder, specializing in mathematical logic, and taught for three years after earning her Ph.D. She taught for a total of 13 years as a graduate and postgraduate until the 1990s when she made the switch to research in education. She began auditing courses and working on research projects at the School of Education at the University of California at Berkeley. This led to a career that included editing reports, books, articles, and curriculum and standards documents. She was the president of the Association for Women in Mathematics from 2007 to 2009 and worked as a mathematics education consultant through 2015 and again after she left Illustrative Mathematics in 2017.

== Projects ==
Kessel has participated in multiple projects pertaining to mathematics education, including the following.

- Editor and indexer, Liping Ma, Knowing and Teaching Elementary Mathematics, first edition, Lawrence Erlbaum Associates, 1999; anniversary edition, Routledge, 2010
- Additional writer, Principles and Standards of School Mathematics, National Council of Teachers of Mathematics, 2000
- Editor, Mathematical Education of Teachers, Conference Board of the Mathematical Sciences, 2001
- Consultant, Research for Better Schools guide to TIMSS public release videos, 2005
- Writer, Learning Across Boundaries: U.S.–Japan Collaboration in Mathematics, Science and Technology Education, 2007
- Editor, Critical Issues in Mathematics Education workshop booklet, Teaching Teachers Mathematics: Research, Ideas, Projects, Evaluation, Mathematical Sciences Research Institute, 2009
- Editor, Mathematical Education of Teachers II, Conference Board of the Mathematical Sciences, 2012
- Writer, Mathematics Curriculum, Teacher Professionalism, and Supporting Policies in Korea and the United States: Summary of a Workshop, 2015, National Academy of Sciences

== Articles, reports, and book chapters ==
=== Gender and education ===
- M. Linn and C. Kessel. (2001). Test bias. In Judith Worrell (editor in chief), Encyclopedia of women and gender (pp. 1129–1140). Academic Press.
- M. Linn and C. Kessel. (2002). Gender differences in cognition and educational performance. In Lynn Nadel (Ed.), Encyclopedia of cognitive science (pp. 261–267). New York: Macmillan.
- M. Linn and C. Kessel. (2005). Gender and assessment. In Carol Goodheart & Judith Worell (Eds.), Handbook of girls’ and women’s psychological health: Gender and well-being across the life span. New York: Oxford University Press.
- C. Kessel. (2006). Perceptions and research: Mathematics, gender, and the SAT. Focus, 26(9), 14–15.
- C. Kessel. (2007). Op ed. Bay Area Businesswoman News, February.
- Many co-authors. (2007). Women mathematicians in the academic ranks: A call to action. Report of the 2006 BIRS workshop on women and mathematics.
- C. Kessel and D. Nelson. (2011). Statistical Trends in Women’s Participation in Science: Commentary on Valla and Ceci (2011). Perspectives on Psychological Science, 6(2), 147–149.
- C. Kessel. (2011). Women. Encyclopedia of Mathematics and Society, edited by Sarah Greenwald and Jill Thompson. Croton-on-Hudson, NY: Golson Media.
- C. Kessel. (2014). Understanding underrepresentation: Women in mathematics and other fields. Mathematical Intelligencer, 0.1007/s00283-013-9441-1. Online 20 March. In print, Volume 36, Issue 4 (2014), 10–18.
- C. Kessel. (2015). Women in mathematics: Change, inertia, stratification, segregation. In Willie Pearson Jr., Lisa M. Frehill, and Connie L. McNeely (editors), Advancing Women in Science: An International Perspective (pp. 171–186, 198–199). Springer International Publishing Switzerland.

=== Mathematics education ===
- A. Arcavi, C. Kessel, L. Meira, and J. Smith. (1998). Teaching mathematical problem solving: A microanalysis of an emergent classroom community. Alan Schoenfeld, Ed Dubinsky, and James Kaput (Eds.), Research in Collegiate Mathematics Education III (pp. 1–70). Providence, RI: American Mathematical Society.
- C. Kessel. (1999). Testing: . . . 2, 3, 4, . . . , 11, 12, 12+; G–, G+: CAP, CAT, CTBS, . . . , ITBS, . . . ; ACT, SAT; GRE, LSAT, MCAT; NTE. MER Newsletter 11(3), 8–11.
- C. Kessel. (2001). What’s in a name? MER Newsletter 13(3), 4–5, 10–11.
- M. Chiu, C. Kessel, J. Moschkovich, and A. Muñoz-Nuñez. (2001). Learning to graph linear functions: A case study of conceptual change. Cognition and Instruction, 19(2), 215–251.
- C. Kessel. (2013). A mathematical perspective on educational research. In Y. Li & J. N. Moschkovich (Eds.), Mathematical proficiency and beliefs in learning and teaching (pp. 237–256). Rotterdam: Sense Publishers.

== Awards ==
- Association for Women in Mathematics twenty-seventh annual Louise Hay Award (January 2017)

In 2017, she was selected as a fellow of the Association for Women in Mathematics in the inaugural class.
