= Wendell Fleming =

American mathematician (1928–2023)

Wendell H. Fleming
- Born: March 7, 1928; Guthrie, Oklahoma, US
- Died: February 18, 2023 (aged 94)
- Education: University of Wisconsin–Madison
- Known for: Geometric measure theory; normal and integral currents
- Scientific career
- Fields: Mathematics
- Workplaces: Brown University
- Doctoral advisor: Laurence Chisholm Young
- Doctoral students: Onésimo Hernández Lerma; Wen-Hsiung Li; Chehrzad Shakiban; Halil Mete Soner; Virginia Warfield; Thaleia Zariphopoulou

Wendell Helms Fleming (March 7, 1928 – February 18, 2023) was an American mathematician specializing in geometrical analysis and stochastic differential equations.

Fleming received his PhD in 1951 under Laurence Chisholm Young at the University of Wisconsin–Madison with the thesis Boundary and Related Notions for Generalized Parametric Surfaces. Fleming was a professor at Brown University, where he retired in 2009 as professor emeritus.

Together with Herbert Federer, Fleming was a pioneer of geometric measure theory. Later in his career, he worked on stochastic processes, stochastic differential equations and their applications in control theory. From 1976 to 1977, he was a Guggenheim Fellow. In 1982 he gave a plenary address (Optimal Control of Markov Processes) at the ICM in Warsaw.

== Awards and honors ==
In 1987 he received with Federer the Leroy P. Steele Prize of the American Mathematical Society. In 1994 he won the Reid Prize from the Society for Industrial and Applied Mathematics. He was given an honorary doctorate at Purdue University in 1991. In 2006 he received the Isaacs Award. In 2012 he became a fellow of the American Mathematical Society. In May 2012 his election to membership in the United States National Academy of Sciences was announced.

== Selected works ==
- Fleming, W. H. (1957), "Irreducible Generalized Surfaces" (PDF), Rivista di Matematica della Università di Parma, (1), 8: 251–281, MR 0115114, Zbl 0090.32001.
- Federer, Herbert; Fleming, Wendell H. (1960), "Normal and integral currents", Annals of Mathematics, II, 72 (4): 458–520, doi:10.2307/1970227, JSTOR 1970227, MR 0123260, Zbl 0187.31301. The first paper of Federer and Fleming illustrating their approach to the theory of perimeters based on the theory of currents.
- with Raymond W. Rishel: Deterministic and stochastic optimal control, Springer, Berlin Heidelberg New York 1975, ISBN 3-540-90155-8
- Functions of several variables, Addison Wesley, 1965, Springer, 2nd edition 1977
- with Halil Mete Soner: Controlled Markov Processes and Viscosity Solutions, Springer, 1992, 2nd edition 2006
