= Trena Wilkerson =

American mathematician

Trena L. Wilkerson (born 1954) is an American mathematician and mathematics educator. She is a Professor of Mathematics Education in the Department of Curriculum & Instruction at Baylor University, and the president of the National Council of Teachers of Mathematics for the 2020–2022 term.

== Education and career ==
Wilkerson majored in mathematics at Mississippi College, earned a master's degree in mathematics education from Southeastern Louisiana University, and worked as a high school teacher in Louisiana for 18 years, from 1976 to 1994.

Returning to graduate study, she earned a Ph.D. in curriculum and instruction in 1994 at the University of Southern Mississippi, specializing in mathematics education, and became an assistant research professor at Louisiana State University from 1994 to 1999, when she moved to her present position at Baylor.

== Recognition ==
Wilkerson is the 2024 recipient of the Louise Hay Award.
