= David Harbater =

American mathematician (born 1952)

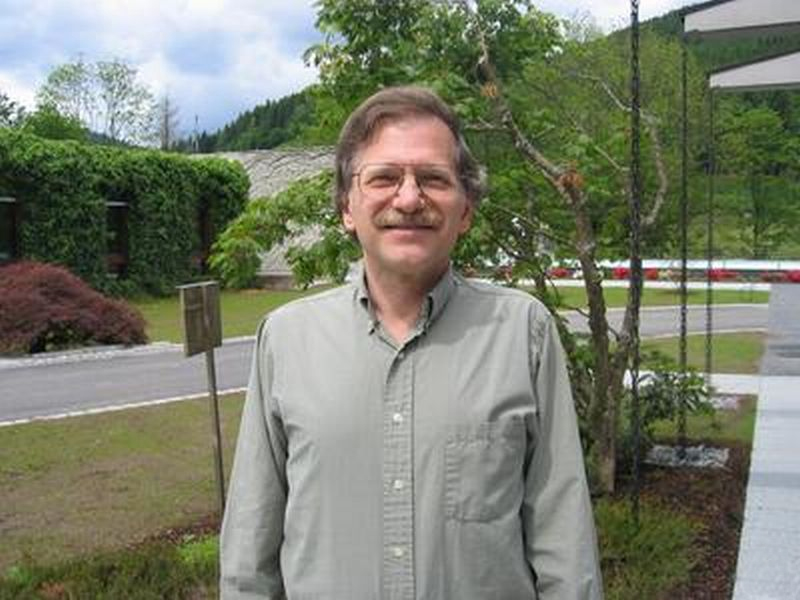
- Born: December 19, 1952 (age 73); New York City, New York, US
- Education: Harvard University (BA); Brandeis University (MA); MIT(PhD)
- Known for: Proof of Abhyankar's conjecture
- Awards: Cole Prize (1995)
- Scientific career
- Fields: Mathematics
- Workplaces: University of Pennsylvania
- Doctoral advisor: Michael Artin
- Doctoral students: Sybilla Beckmann; Rachel Pries

David Harbater (born December 19, 1952) is an American mathematician at the University of Pennsylvania, well known for his work in Galois theory, algebraic geometry and arithmetic geometry.

== Early life and education ==
Harbater was born in New York City and attended Stuyvesant High School, where he was on the math team. After graduating in 1970, he entered Harvard University.

After graduating summa cum laude in 1974, Harbater earned a master's degree from Brandeis University and then a Ph.D. in 1978 from MIT, where he wrote a dissertation (Deformation Theory and the Fundamental Group in Algebraic Geometry) under the direction of Michael Artin.

== Research ==
He solved the inverse Galois problem over $\mathbb{Q}_p(t)$, and made many other significant contributions to the field of Galois theory.

Harbater's recent work on patching over fields, together with Julia Hartmann and Daniel Krashen, has had applications in such varied fields as quadratic forms, central simple algebras and local-global principles.

== Awards and honors ==
In 1995, Harbater was awarded the Cole Prize for his solution, with Michel Raynaud, of the long outstanding Abhyankar conjecture.

In 2012, he became a fellow of the American Mathematical Society.

== Selected publications ==
- Harbater, D. (1994). "Abhyankar's Conjecture on Galois Groups Over Curves". Invent. Math. 117 (1): 1–25. Bibcode:1994InMat.117....1H. doi:10.1007/BF01232232. S2CID 121690794.
