= Hackett Publishing Company =

American academic publishing house

- Founded: 1972
- Country of origin: United States
- Headquarters location: Indianapolis
- Distribution: Self-distributed (US); Gazelle Book Services (UK); NewSouth Books (Australia)
- Publication types: Books
- Official website: www.hackettpublishing.com

Hackett Publishing Company, Inc. is an academic publishing house located in Indianapolis, Indiana. It was originally founded and located near Harvard University in Cambridge, Massachusetts. Since beginning operations in 1972, Hackett has concentrated mainly on the humanities, especially classical and philosophical texts. Many Hackett titles are used as textbooks, making the company very visible at American universities. Their publications are distinguished by their high quality and extensive commentary.

While Hackett titles are generally recognized for their simple covers (consisting of the title and the author on a plain solid color background), more recent editions of classical (particularly Greek and Latin) works have been notable for their anachronistic use of modern photographs as covers. For example, an image of the Vietnam Veterans Memorial adorns the Hackett edition of Virgil's Aeneid, while Robert F. Sargent's famous photograph of the Allies storming the beaches of Normandy during D-Day is used with Homer's Iliad. Their issue of the Republic has for its cover "The Weather Project," photographed by Jens Ziehe.
