= Judith Roitman =

American mathematician

Judith A. Roitman
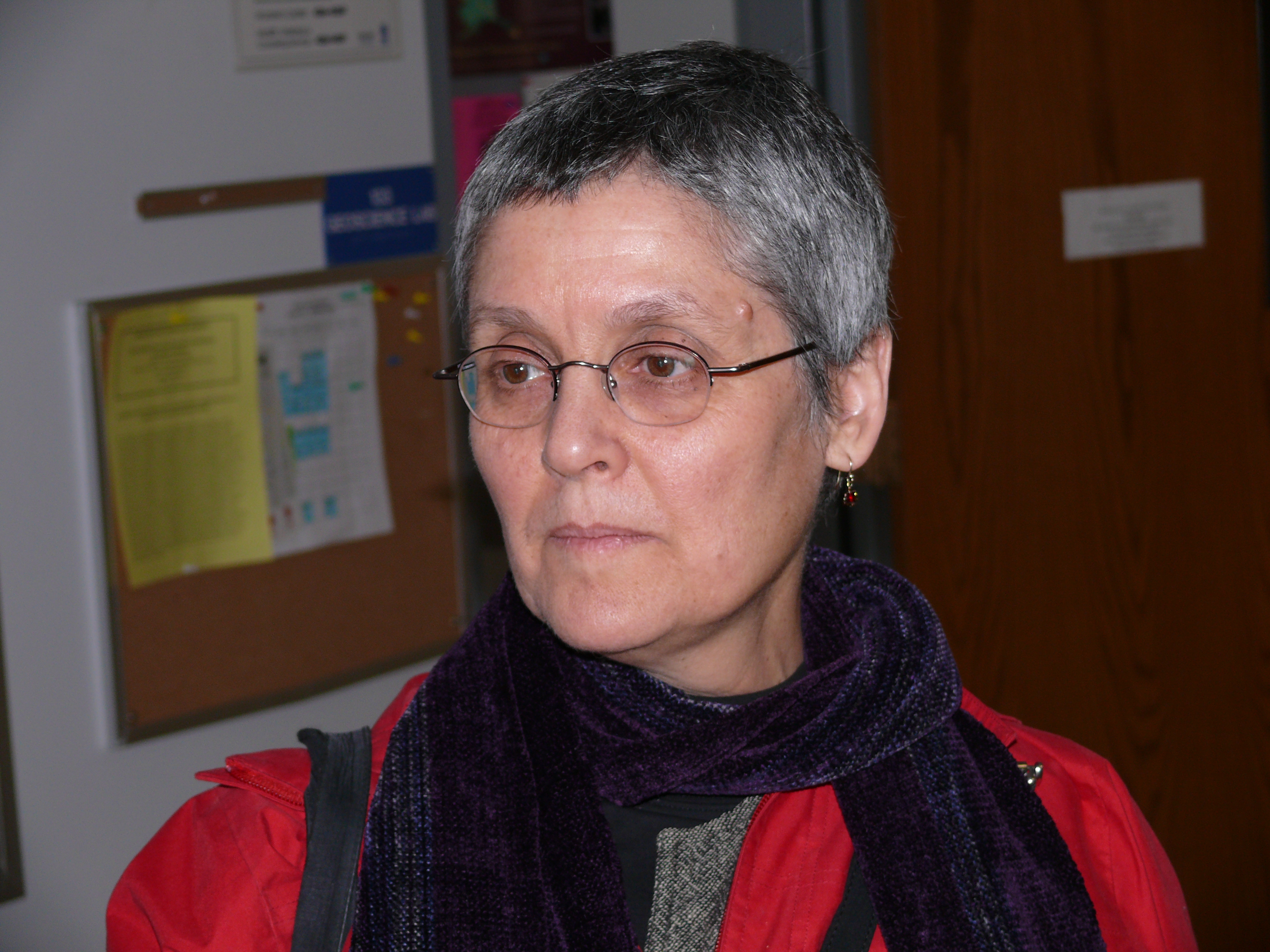
- Prof. Judy Roitman during the conference "Boise Extravaganza in Set Theory BEST 17", Boise, Idaho, March 2008
- Born: November 12, 1945 (age 80); New York City
- Other name: Bon Hae
- Known for: Topology, set theory, Boolean algebras, mathematics education
- Spouse: Stanley Lombardo
- Scientific career
- Fields: Mathematician
- Workplaces: University of Kansas
- Doctoral advisor: Robert M. Solovay

Judith A. "Judy" Roitman (born November 12, 1945) is a mathematician, a retired professor at the University of Kansas. She specializes in set theory, topology, Boolean algebras, and mathematics education.

== Biography ==
Roitman was born in 1945 in New York City. She attended Oberlin College, followed by Sarah Lawrence College, graduating in 1966 with a degree in English literature. Next, she became interested in mathematical linguistics. As she had little formal mathematical education, Roitman started taking mathematics classes at the University of California, Berkeley and San Francisco State University. She had enjoyed mathematics as a high school student and found her interest renewed. In 1969 she started graduate studies in mathematics at Berkeley. During graduate school, she spent some time teaching mathematics in elementary schools as a Community Teaching Fellow with Project SEED. Roitman received her Ph.D. in 1974 from UC Berkeley with a thesis in topology; her thesis advisor was Robert M. Solovay. She taught at Wellesley College for three years, then spent a semester at the Institute for Advanced Study. She has been at the University of Kansas since then.

She has been involved in the field of mathematics education for much of her career, running workshops for elementary school teachers and high school teachers and observing them in the classroom. She has encouraged individual mathematicians and the mathematical community at large to get involved and take mathematics education more seriously. She was in the National Council of Teachers of Mathematics writing group that produced Principles and Standards for School Mathematics. Dismayed at the politicization of U.S. mathematics education, Roitman has insisted, "There is no math war."

Roitman has been active in the Association for Women in Mathematics since its early years, and she served as president for the term 1979–1981. She has been a Zen Buddhist since 1976, and is currently the guiding teacher of the Kansas Zen Center, of which she and her husband Stanley Lombardo were founding members.

Roitman is also a poet. Her poetry has appeared in a number of magazines, seven chapbooks, and two books.

== Awards and honors ==
In 1996, she received the Louise Hay Award as recognition for her role as a math educator. In 2012 she became a fellow of the American Mathematical Society. In 2017, she was selected as a fellow of the Association for Women in Mathematics in the inaugural class.

== Selected publications ==
- Introduction to Modern Set Theory. Wiley-Interscience. January 16, 1990. ISBN 0-471-63519-7.
- Roitman, Judith (Winter 1992). "The Uses of Set Theory". The Mathematical Intelligencer. 14 (1). Springer Verlag: 63–69. doi:10.1007/BF03024144. S2CID 120746653.
- "Beyond the Math Wars" (PDF). Contemporary Issues in Mathematics Education. MSRI Publications 36, Cambridge University Press. 1999. pp. 123–134. ISBN 0-521-65255-3.
- Introduction to Modern Set Theory, Revised Edition. Virginia Commonwealth University. December 6, 2011. ISBN 978-0982406-24-3.

== Selected poetry ==
- Slippage. Potes & Poets Press. 1999. ISBN 0-937013-97-8.
- No Face. First Intensity Press. July 1, 2008. ISBN 978-1-889960-17-3.
- Slackline. Hank's Original Loose Gravel Press. 2012.
- Furnace Mountain Poems. Omerta. 2013. Archived from the original on January 19, 2019.
- Two: (Ghazals). Horse Less Press. 2014.
- Ku: a thumb book. Airfoil Press. 2015.
- Provisional. Dancing Girl Press. 2018.
- Roswell. Theenk Books. October 18, 2018. ISBN 978-0988389-15-1.
