= Riho Terras (mathematician) =

Estonian-American mathematician

Riho Terras (June 13, 1939 – November 28, 2005) was an Estonian-American mathematician. He was born in Tartu, Estonia, and moved to Ulm, Germany, before starting school. In 1951, he emigrated to the United States along with his mother. In 1965, he was given the Milton Abramowitz award for his studies at the University of Maryland. He finished his PhD in 1970 at the University of Illinois Urbana-Champaign.

He is known for the Terras theorem about the Collatz conjecture, published in 1976, which proved that the conjecture holds for "almost all" numbers and established bounds for the conjecture.

He married fellow mathematician Audrey Terras.
