= Nathan Keyfitz =

Canadian demographer (1913–2010)

- Born: June 29, 1913; Montreal, Quebec, Canada
- Died: April 6, 2010 (aged 96); Cambridge, Massachusetts, United States
- Education: McGill University; University of Chicago
- Children: Barbara Keyfitz
- Scientific career
- Fields: Demography
- Workplaces: University of Toronto; University of Chicago; University of California, Berkeley; Harvard University
- Doctoral advisor: William Fielding Ogburn

Nathan Keyfitz FRSC FRSS (June 29, 1913 – April 6, 2010) was a Canadian demographer, a pioneer of mathematical demography.

== Professional career ==
Keyfitz studied at McGill University, graduating with a B.S. in mathematics in 1934. He worked for the Dominion Bureau of Statistics in Canada from 1936 to 1959, meanwhile earning a Ph.D. in sociology from the University of Chicago in 1952. In 1959, he took a professorship at the University of Toronto; he moved from there to the University of Chicago and the University of California, Berkeley before joining the faculty of Harvard University as Andelot Professor of Sociology in 1972. From 1978 to 1980 he served as Director of the Harvard Center for Population and Development Studies. He retired from Harvard in 1981, only to take another faculty position at Ohio State University and then to direct the Population Program at the International Institute for Applied Systems Analysis in Austria from 1983 to 1993. He also consulted frequently in Indonesia over a period of many years.

He was president of the Population Association of America from 1970 to 1971.

== Awards and honors ==
Keyfitz was a fellow of the Royal Society of Canada, the Royal Statistical Society, the American Statistical Association, and the American Academy of Arts and Sciences, and a member of the U.S. National Academy of Sciences. He was given seven honorary doctorates, won the Mindel C. Sheps Award of the Population Association of America in 1976, and won the Common Wealth Award of Distinguished Service in 1991.

In June 2013, a symposium on mathematical demography was held in honor of the centennial of his birth.

== Books ==
- Introduction to the Mathematics of Population (Addison-Wesley, 1968). ISBN 978-0-201-53167-1.
- World Population: An Analysis of Vital Data (with Wilhelm Flieger, Univ. of Chicago Press, 1968). ISBN 978-0-226-43234-2.
- Population: Facts and Methods of Demography (with Wilhelm Flieger, W.H. Freeman and Company, 1971)
- Applied Mathematical Demography (Springer-Verlag, 1977)
- Population Change and Social Policy (Abt Books, 1982)
- World Population Growth and Aging: Demographic Trends in the Late Twentieth Century (with Wilhelm Flieger, Univ. of Chicago Press, 1990)

== Personal ==
Keyfitz's daughter, Barbara Keyfitz, is a notable mathematician.
