= Karen D. King =

American mathematics educator

Karen D King
- Born: July 6, 1971; Washington, D.C.
- Died: December 24, 2019 (aged 48)
- Title: Program Director
- Awards: AWM/MAA Falconer Lecturer

Academic background
- Education: University of Maryland
- Doctoral advisor: Patricia F Campbell

Academic work
- Discipline: Mathematics Education
- Institutions: National Science Foundation; National Council of Teachers of Mathematics; New York University; Michigan State University; San Diego State University

Karen Denise King (July 6, 1971 – December 24, 2019) was an African-American mathematics educator, a program director at National Science Foundation, and a 2012 AWM/MAA Falconer Lecturer.

== Early life ==
Karen Denise King was born on July 6, 1971, in Washington, D.C. She was selected for the National Aeronautics and Space Administration Women in Science and Engineering (WISE) Scholars Program at Spelman College as an undergraduate and finished her degree in mathematics magna cum laude in 3 years. King next attended University of Maryland with a National Science Foundation fellowship and earned her Ph.D. in Mathematics Education in 1997. Her dissertation advisor was Patricia F. Campbell.

== Professional career ==
King began her career as an assistant professor at San Diego State University in 1997. In 1999 she moved to Michigan State University. In 2006 King relocated to New York University as an associate professor. While a professor, King focused her research and publications on urban mathematics reform, the mathematical preparation of K-12 teachers, and mathematics professional development policies. King became the Director of Research for National Council of Teachers of Mathematics in 2011 where she co-authored the book Disrupting Tradition: Research and Practice in Mathematics. She later became a program director at the National Science Foundation of Education and Human Resources. In 2012 she was honored as an AWM/MAA Falconer Lecturer and served on the writing team that wrote The Mathematical Education of Teachers II. King also served as an associate editor for the Journal for Research in Mathematics Education from 2001 to 2004.

King's work earned her recognition by Mathematically Gifted & Black, where she was featured as a Black History Month 2020 Honoree.

== Memorial Award ==
The Association of Mathematics Teacher Educators established an award in Dr. King's memory, the Karen D. King Excellence in Advocacy Award. Given every 4 years, the award recognizes unique contributions in advocating for ideas, plans, or decisions that enhance math teacher preparation.

== Publications ==
Co-Author

- King, K.D., Tate, William F., Anderson, Celia R., (2011) Disrupting Tradition: Research and Practice in Mathematics. Reston, VA:National Council of Teachers of Mathematics

Contributor

- American Mathematical Society. (2012) The Mathematical Education of Teachers II (Cbms Issues in Mathematics Education). American Mathematical Society
- RAND Mathematics Study Panel. (2003). Mathematical proficiency for all students: Toward a strategic research and development program in mathematics education. Santa Monica, CA: RAND Education.

Book Chapter

- Rasmussen, C., Yackel, E., & King, K. (2003). Social and sociomathematical norms in the mathematics classroom. In R. Charles (Ed.). Teaching mathematics through problem solving: It's about learning mathematics. Reston, VA: National Council of Teachers of Mathematics.
- King, K. D., Hillel, J., & Artigue, M. (2001) Technology. In D. Holton (Ed.). Teaching and Learning in University Level Mathematics (Results of the ICMI Study). Dordrecht: Kluwer Academic Publishers.
