= Nathan Harter =

American football coach and professor

Biographical details
- Born: February 15, 1884; Medina, Ohio, US
- Died: January 9, 1952 (aged 67); Greenville, Pennsylvania, US
- Education: Wittenberg (1909)

Coaching career (HC unless noted)
- 1911–1912: Thiel

Head coaching record
- Overall: 3–5–1

Nathan Warren Harter (November 15, 1884 – January 9, 1952) was an American football coach and mathematics professor. He served as the head football coach at Thiel College in Greenville, Pennsylvania, from 1911 to 1912, compiling a record of 3–5–1.

Harter was a 1909 graduate of Wittenberg College.

== Head coaching record ==
Year	Team	Overall	Conference	Standing	Bowl/playoffs
Thiel Tomcats (Independent) (1911–1912)
1911	Thiel	1–1			
1912	Thiel	2–4–1			
Thiel:		3–5–1			
Total:		3–5–1			
