= Seminormal ring =

In algebra, a seminormal ring is a commutative reduced ring in which, whenever x, y satisfy $x^3 = y^2$, there is s with $s^2 = x$ and $s^3 = y$. This definition was given by Swan (1980) as a simplification of the original definition of Traverso (1970).

A basic example is an integrally closed domain, i.e., a normal ring. For an example which is not normal, one can consider the non-integral ring $\mathbb{Z}[x, y]/xy$, or the ring of a nodal curve.

In general, a reduced scheme $X$ can be said to be seminormal if every morphism $Y \to X$ which induces a homeomorphism of topological spaces, and an isomorphism on all residue fields, is an isomorphism of schemes.

A semigroup is said to be seminormal if its semigroup algebra is seminormal.
