= Association for Women in Mathematics =

American professional society

- Formation: 1971
- Type: Professional organization
- Headquarters: Providence, Rhode Island
- Members: 5200
- President: Talitha Washington
- Website: awm-math.org

The Association for Women in Mathematics (AWM) is a professional society whose mission is to encourage women and girls to study and to have active careers in the mathematical sciences, and to promote equal opportunity for and the equal treatment of women and girls in the mathematical sciences. The AWM was founded in 1971 and incorporated in the state of Massachusetts. AWM has approximately 5200 members, including over 250 institutional members, such as colleges, universities, institutes, and mathematical societies. It offers numerous programs and workshops to mentor women and girls in the mathematical sciences. Much of AWM's work is supported through federal grants.

== History ==
The Association was founded in 1971 as the Association of Women Mathematicians, but the name was changed almost immediately. As reported in "A Brief History of the Association for Women in Mathematics: The Presidents' Perspectives", by Lenore Blum:

As Judy Green remembers (and Chandler Davis, early AWM friend, concurs):

The formal idea of women getting together and forming a caucus was first made publicly at a MAG [Mathematics Action Group] meeting in 1971 ... in Atlantic City. Joanne Darken, then an instructor at Temple University and now at the Community College of Philadelphia, stood up at the meeting and suggested that the women present remain and form a caucus. I have been able to document six women who remained: me (I was a graduate student at Maryland at the time), Joanne Darken, Mary Gray (she was already at American University), Diane Laison (then an instructor at Temple), Gloria Olive (a Senior Lecturer at the University of Otago, New Zealand who was visiting the U.S. at the time) and Annie Selden... It's not absolutely clear what happened next, except that I've personally always thought that Mary was responsible for getting the whole thing organized ....

Mary Gray, an early organizer and first president, placed an advertisement in the February 1971 Notices of the AMS, and wrote the first issue of the AWM Newsletter that May. Early goals of the association focused on equal pay for equal work, as well as equal consideration for admission to graduate school and support while there; for faculty appointments at all levels; for promotion and for tenure; for administrative appointments; and for government grants, positions on review and advisory panels and positions in professional organizations. Alice T. Schafer, who succeeded Mary Gray as second president of the AWM, set up an AWM office at Wellesley College. At this point, AWM began to be a recognized established presence in the mathematics scene. In 1973 AWM was legally incorporated, and in 1974 it received tax-exempt status.

The AWM holds an annual meeting at the Joint Mathematics Meetings. In 2011, during its fortieth-anniversary celebration 40 Years and Counting, the association initiated a biennial research symposium.

The Association for Women in Mathematics Newsletter is the member journal of the organization. The first issue was published in May 1971, a few months after AWM was founded. All regular members of AWM can request that hard copies of the newsletter be sent to them. The newsletter is now open access and anyone can read or download a pdf file of recent or past issues from the AWM website.

== Lectures ==
The AWM sponsors three honorary lecture series.

- The Noether Lectures – honor women who "have made fundamental and sustained contributions to the mathematical sciences". Presented in association with the American Mathematical Society, the lecture is given at the annual Joint Mathematics Meetings.
- The Falconer Lectures – honor women who "have made distinguished contributions to the mathematical sciences or mathematics education. Presented in association with the Mathematical Association of America, the lecture is given at the annual MathFest.
- The Kovalevsky Lectures – honor women who have "made distinguished contributions in applied or computational mathematics". Presented in association with the Society for Industrial and Applied Mathematics (SIAM), the lecture is given at the SIAM Annual Meeting. The lecture series is named for the mathematician Sonia Kovalevsky.

== Awards ==
The AWM sponsors several awards and prizes.

- Alice T. Schafer Prize – given each year "to an undergraduate woman for excellence in mathematics".
- Louise Hay Award – given each year for "outstanding achievements of a woman in mathematics education".
- M. Gweneth Humphreys Award – given each year for "outstanding mentorship activities of a woman in the mathematical sciences".
- Ruth I. Michler Memorial Prize – given each year to a woman recently tenured in mathematics. The prize funds a semester in residence at Cornell University without teaching obligations.
- AWM Service Award - given each year to women helping to promote and support women in mathematics through exceptional voluntary service to the Association for Women in Mathematics.

Three recently created prizes for early-career women are also sponsored by the AWM.

- AWM-Birman Research Prize – given every other year beginning in 2015 for "exceptional research in topology/geometry".
- AWM-Microsoft Research Prize – given every other year beginning in 2014 for "exceptional research in algebra/number theory".
- AWM-Sadosky Research Prize – given every other year beginning in 2014 for "exceptional research in analysis".

The AWM Fellows program, begun in 2018, recognizes "members who have demonstrated a sustained commitment to the support and advancement of women in the mathematical sciences".

== Presidents ==
- Mary W. Gray, 1971–1973
- Alice T. Schafer, 1973–1975
- Lenore Blum, 1975–1979
- Judith Roitman, 1979–1981
- Bhama Srinivasan, 1981–1983
- Linda Preiss Rothschild, 1983–1985
- Linda Keen, 1985–1987
- Rhonda Hughes, 1987–1989
- Jill P. Mesirov, 1989–1991
- Carol S. Wood, 1991–1993
- Cora Sadosky, 1993–1995
- Chuu-Lian Terng, 1995–1997
- Sylvia M. Wiegand, 1997–1999
- Jean E. Taylor, 1999–2001
- Suzanne Lenhart, 2001–2003
- Carolyn S. Gordon, 2003–2005
- Barbara Keyfitz, 2005–2007
- Cathy Kessel, 2007–2009
- Georgia Benkart, 2009–2011
- Jill Pipher, 2011–2013
- Ruth Charney, 2013–2015
- Kristin Lauter, 2015–2017
- Ami Radunskaya, 2017–2019
- Ruth Haas, 2019–2021
- Kathryn Leonard, 2021–2023
- Talitha Washington, 2023–2025

== See also ==
- African Women in Mathematics Association
- European Women in Mathematics
- Femmes et Mathématiques
- List of women in mathematics
- Timeline of women in mathematics
