= Equidissection =

Partition of a polygon into triangles of equal area

A 6-equidissection of a square

In geometry, an equidissection is a partition of a polygon into triangles of equal area. The study of equidissections began in the late 1960s with Monsky's theorem, which states that a square cannot be equidissected into an odd number of triangles. In fact, most polygons cannot be equidissected at all.

Much of the literature is aimed at generalizing Monsky's theorem to broader classes of polygons. The general question is: Which polygons can be equidissected into how many pieces? Particular attention has been given to trapezoids, kites, regular polygons, centrally symmetric polygons, polyominos, and hypercubes.

Equidissections do not have many direct applications. They are considered interesting because the results are counterintuitive at first, and for a geometry problem with such a simple definition, the theory requires some surprisingly sophisticated algebraic tools. Many of the results rely upon extending p-adic valuations to the real numbers and extending Sperner's lemma to more general colored graphs.

== Overview ==
=== Definitions ===
A dissection of a polygon P is a finite set of triangles that do not overlap and whose union is all of P. A dissection into n triangles is called an n-dissection, and it is classified as an even dissection or an odd dissection according to whether n is even or odd.

An equidissection is a dissection in which every triangle has the same area. For a polygon P, the set of all n for which an n-equidissection of P exists is called the spectrum of P and denoted S(P). A general theoretical goal is to compute the spectrum of a given polygon.

A dissection is called simplicial if the triangles meet only along common edges. Some authors restrict their attention to simplicial dissections, especially in the secondary literature, since they are easier to work with. For example, the usual statement of Sperner's lemma applies only to simplicial dissections. Often simplicial dissections are called triangulations, although the vertices of the triangles are not restricted to the vertices or edges of the polygon. Simplicial equidissections are therefore also called equal-area triangulations.

The terms can be extended to higher-dimensional polytopes: an equidissection is set of simplexes having the same n-volume.

=== Preliminaries ===
It is easy to find an n-equidissection of a triangle for all n. As a result, if a polygon has an m-equidissection, then it also has an mn-equidissection for all n. In fact, often a polygon's spectrum consists precisely of the multiples of some number m; in this case, both the spectrum and the polygon are called principal and the spectrum is denoted $\langle m \rangle$. For example, the spectrum of a triangle is $\langle 1 \rangle$. A simple example of a non-principal polygon is the quadrilateral with vertices (0, 0), (1, 0), (0, 1), (3/2, 3/2); its spectrum includes 2 and 3 but not 1.

Affine transformations of the plane are useful for studying equidissections, including translations, uniform and non-uniform scaling, reflections, rotations, shears, and other similarities and linear maps. Since an affine transformation preserves straight lines and ratios of areas, it sends equidissections to equidissections. This means that one is free to apply any affine transformation to a polygon that might give it a more manageable form. For example, it is common to choose coordinates such that three of the vertices of a polygon are (0, 1), (0, 0), and (1, 0).

The fact that affine transformations preserve equidissections also means that certain results can be easily generalized. All results stated for a regular polygon also hold for affine-regular polygons; in particular, results concerning the unit square also apply to other parallelograms, including rectangles and rhombuses. All results stated for polygons with integer coordinates also apply to polygons with rational coordinates, or polygons whose vertices fall on any other lattice.

=== Best results ===
Monsky's theorem states that a square has no odd equidissections, so its spectrum is $\langle 2 \rangle$. More generally, it is known that centrally symmetric polygons and polyominos have no odd equidissections. A conjecture by Sherman K. Stein proposes that no special polygon has an odd equidissection, where a special polygon is one whose equivalence classes of parallel edges each sum to the zero vector. Squares, centrally symmetric polygons, polyominos, and polyhexes are all special polygons.

For n > 4, the spectrum of a regular n-gon is $\langle n \rangle$. For n > 1, the spectrum of an n-dimensional cube is $\langle n! \rangle$, where n! is the factorial of n. and the spectrum of an n-dimensional cross-polytope is $\langle 2^{n-1} \rangle$. The latter follows mutatis mutandis from the proof for the octahedron in

Let T(a) be a trapezoid where a is the ratio of parallel side lengths. If a is a rational number, then T(a) is principal. In fact, if r/s is a fraction in lowest terms, then $S(T(r/s)) = \langle r + s \rangle$. More generally, all convex polygons with rational coordinates can be equidissected, although not all of them are principal; see the above example of a kite with a vertex at (3/2, 3/2).

At the other extreme, if a is a transcendental number, then T(a) has no equidissection. More generally, no polygon whose vertex coordinates are algebraically independent has an equidissection. This means that almost all polygons with more than three sides cannot be equidissected. Although most polygons cannot be cut into equal-area triangles, all polygons can be cut into equal-area quadrilaterals.

If a is an algebraic irrational number, then T(a) is a trickier case. If a is algebraic of degree 2 or 3 (quadratic or cubic), and its conjugates all have positive real parts, then S(T(a)) contains all sufficiently large n such that n/(1 + a) is an algebraic integer. It is conjectured that a similar condition involving stable polynomials may determine whether or not the spectrum is empty for algebraic numbers a of all degrees.

== History ==
The idea of an equidissection seems like the kind of elementary geometric concept that should be quite old. Aigner & Ziegler (2010) remark of Monsky's theorem, "one could have guessed that surely the answer must have been known for a long time (if not to the Greeks)." But the study of equidissections did not begin until 1965, when Fred Richman was preparing a master's degree exam at New Mexico State University.

=== Monsky's theorem ===
Richman wanted to include a question on geometry in the exam, and he noticed that it was difficult to find (what is now called) an odd equidissection of a square. Richman proved to himself that it was impossible for 3 or 5, that the existence of an n-equidissection implies the existence of an (n + 2)-dissection, and that certain quadrilaterals arbitrarily close to being squares have odd equidissections. However, he did not solve the general problem of odd equidissections of squares, and he left it off the exam. Richman's friend John Thomas became interested in the problem; in his recollection,

"Everyone to whom the problem was put (myself included) said something like 'that is not my area but the question surely must have been considered and the answer is probably well known.' Some thought they had seen it, but could not remember where. I was interested because it reminded me of Sperner's Lemma in topology, which has a clever odd-even proof."

Thomas proved that an odd equidissection was impossible if the coordinates of the vertices are rational numbers with odd denominators. He submitted this proof to Mathematics Magazine, but it was put on hold:

"The referee's reaction was predictable. He thought the problem might be fairly easy (although he could not solve it) and was possibly well-known (although he could find no reference to it)."

The question was instead given as an Advanced Problem in the American Mathematical Monthly (Richman & Thomas 1967). When nobody else submitted a solution, the proof was published in Mathematics Magazine (Thomas 1968), three years after it was written. Monsky (1970) then built on Thomas' argument to prove that there are no odd equidissections of a square, without any rationality assumptions.

Monsky's proof relies on two pillars: a combinatorial result that generalizes Sperner's lemma and an algebraic result, the existence of a 2-adic valuation on the real numbers. A clever coloring of the plane then implies that in all dissections of the square, at least one triangle has an area with what amounts to an even denominator, and therefore all equidissections must be even. The essence of the argument is found already in Thomas (1968), but Monsky (1970) was the first to use a 2-adic valuation to cover dissections with arbitrary coordinates.

=== Generalizations ===
The first generalization of Monsky's theorem was Mead (1979), who proved that the spectrum of an n-dimensional cube is $\langle n! \rangle$. The proof is revisited by Bekker & Netsvetaev (1998).

Generalization to regular polygons arrived in 1985, during a geometry seminar run by G. D. Chakerian at UC Davis. Elaine Kasimatis, a graduate student, "was looking for some algebraic topic she could slip into" the seminar. Sherman Stein suggested dissections of the square and the cube: "a topic that Chakerian grudgingly admitted was geometric." After her talk, Stein asked about regular pentagons. Kasimatis answered with Kasimatis (1989), proving that for n > 5, the spectrum of a regular n-gon is $\langle n \rangle$. Her proof builds on Monsky's proof, extending the p-adic valuation to the complex numbers for each prime divisor of n and applying some elementary results from the theory of cyclotomic fields. It is also the first proof to explicitly use an affine transformation to set up a convenient coordinate system. Kasimatis & Stein (1990) then framed the problem of finding the spectrum of a general polygon, introducing the terms spectrum and principal. They proved that almost all polygons lack equidissections, and that not all polygons are principal.

Kasimatis & Stein (1990) began the study of the spectra of two particular generalizations of squares: trapezoids and kites. Trapezoids have been further studied by Jepsen (1996), Monsky (1996), and Jepsen & Monsky (2008). Kites have been further studied by Jepsen, Sedberry & Hoyer (2009). General quadrilaterals have been studied in Su & Ding (2003). Several papers have been authored at Hebei Normal University, chiefly by Professor Ding Ren and his students Du Yatao and Su Zhanjun.

Attempting to generalize the results for regular n-gons for even n, Stein (1989) conjectured that no centrally symmetric polygon has an odd equidissection, and he proved the n = 6 and n = 8 cases. The full conjecture was proved by Monsky (1990). A decade later, Stein made what he describes as "a surprising breakthrough", conjecturing that no polyomino has an odd equidissection. He proved the result of a polyomino with an odd number of squares in Stein (1999). The full conjecture was proved when Praton (2002) treated the even case.

The topic of equidissections has recently been popularized by treatments in The Mathematical Intelligencer (Stein 2004), a volume of the Carus Mathematical Monographs (Stein & Szabó 2008), and the fourth edition of Proofs from THE BOOK (Aigner & Ziegler 2010).

== Related problems ==
Sakai, Nara & Urrutia (2005) consider a variation of the problem: Given a convex polygon K, how much of its area can be covered by n non-overlapping triangles of equal area inside K? The ratio of the area of the best possible coverage to the area of K is denoted t_{n}(K). If K has an n-equidissection, then t_{n}(K) = 1; otherwise it is less than 1. The authors show that for a quadrilateral K, t_{n}(K) ≥ 4n/(4n + 1), with t_{2}(K) = 8/9 if and only if K is affinely congruent to the trapezoid T(2/3). For a pentagon, t_{2}(K) ≥ 2/3, t_{3}(K) ≥ 3/4, and t_{n}(K) ≥ 2n/(2n + 1) for n ≥ 5.

Günter M. Ziegler asked the converse problem in 2003: Given a dissection of the whole of a polygon into n triangles, how close can the triangle areas be to equal? In particular, what is the smallest possible difference between the areas of the smallest and largest triangles? Let the smallest difference be M(n) for a square and M(a, n) for the trapezoid T(a). Then M(n) is 0 for even n and greater than 0 for odd n. Mansow (2003) gave the asymptotic upper bound M(n) = O(1/n^{2}) (see Big O notation). Schulze (2011) improves the bound to M(n) = O(1/n^{3}) with a better dissection, and he proves that there exist values of a for which M(a, n) decreases arbitrarily quickly. Labbé, Rote & Ziegler (2018) obtain a superpolynomial upper bound, derived from an explicit construction that uses the Thue–Morse sequence.

== Bibliography ==
Secondary sources

- Aigner, Martin; Ziegler, Günter M. (2010), "One square and an odd number of triangles", Proofs from THE BOOK (4th ed.), pp. 131–138, doi:10.1007/978-3-642-00856-6_20, ISBN 978-3-642-00855-9, Zbl 1185.00001
- Barker, William H.; Howe, Roger (2007), Continuous Symmetry: From Euclid to Klein, American Mathematical Society, ISBN 978-0-8218-3900-3
- Klee, Víctor; Wagon, Stan (1991), Old and New Unsolved Problems in Plane Geometry and Number Theory, Dolciani Mathematical Expositions, vol. 11, Mathematical Association of America, ISBN 978-0-88385-315-3
- Stein, Sherman K. (March 2004), "Cutting a Polygon into Triangles of Equal Areas", The Mathematical Intelligencer, 26 (1): 17–21, doi:10.1007/BF02985395, S2CID 117930135, Zbl 1186.52015
- Stein, Sherman K.; Szabó, Sándor (2008), "Tiling by Triangles of Equal Areas", Algebra and Tiling: Homomorphisms in the Service of Geometry, Carus Mathematical Monographs, vol. 25, Mathematical Association of America, pp. 107–134, ISBN 978-0-88385-041-1, Zbl 0930.52003

Primary sources

- Bekker, B. M.; Netsvetaev, N. Yu. (October 1998), "Generalized Sperner lemma and subdivisions into simplices of equal volume", Journal of Mathematical Sciences, 91 (6): 3492–3498, doi:10.1007/BF02434927, S2CID 123203936, Zbl 0891.51013
- Du, Yatao (May 2003), "多边形的等积三角剖分 (Further Results about Odd Equidissection)", Journal of Hebei Normal University (Natural Science Edition), 27 (3): 220–222, Zbl 1036.52019
- Du, Yatao; Ding, Ren (March 2005), "More on cutting a polygon into triangles of equal areas" (PDF), Journal of Applied Mathematics and Computing, 17 (1–2): 259–267, doi:10.1007/BF02936053, S2CID 16100898, Zbl 1066.52017, archived from the original (PDF) on 2015-04-02
- Hales, A. W.; Straus, E. G. (March 1982), "Projective colorings", Pacific Journal of Mathematics, 99 (2): 31–43, doi:10.2140/pjm.1982.99.31, MR 0651484, Zbl 0451.51010
- Jepsen, Charles H. (June–July 1996), "Equidissections of Trapezoids" (PDF), The American Mathematical Monthly, 103 (6): 498–500, doi:10.2307/2974717, JSTOR 2974717, Zbl 0856.51007, archived from the original (PDF) on 2010-06-21
- Jepsen, Charles H.; Monsky, Paul (6 December 2008), "Constructing Equidissections for Certain Classes of Trapezoids" (PDF), Discrete Mathematics, 308 (23): 5672–5681, doi:10.1016/j.disc.2007.10.031, Zbl 1156.51304, archived from the original (PDF) on 21 June 2010
- Jepsen, Charles H.; Sedberry, Trevor; Hoyer, Rolf (18 March 2009), "Equidissections of kite-shaped quadrilaterals", Involve, 2 (1): 89–93, doi:10.2140/involve.2009.2.89, Zbl 1176.52003
- Kasimatis, Elaine A. (December 1989), "Dissections of regular polygons into triangles of equal areas", Discrete & Computational Geometry, 4 (1): 375–381, doi:10.1007/BF02187738, Zbl 0675.52005
- Kasimatis, Elaine A.; Stein, Sherman K. (1 December 1990), "Equidissections of polygons", Discrete Mathematics, 85 (3): 281–294, doi:10.1016/0012-365X(90)90384-T, Zbl 0736.05028
- Labbé, Jean-Philippe; Rote, Günter; Ziegler, Günter M. (2018), "Area Difference Bounds for Dissections of a Square into an Odd Number of Triangles", Experimental Mathematics, 29 (3): 1–23, arXiv:1708.02891, doi:10.1080/10586458.2018.1459961, S2CID 3995120
- Mansow, K. (2003), Ungerade Triangulierungen eines Quadrats von kleiner Diskrepanz (Diplomarbeit), Germany: TU Berlin
- Mead, David G. (September 1979), "Dissection of the hypercube into simplexes", Proceedings of the American Mathematical Society, 76 (2): 302–304, doi:10.1090/S0002-9939-1979-0537093-6, Zbl 0423.51012
- Monsky, Paul (February 1970), "On Dividing a Square Into Triangles", The American Mathematical Monthly, 77 (2): 161–164, doi:10.2307/2317329, JSTOR 2317329, Zbl 0187.19701 Reprinted as Monsky, Paul (July 1977), "On Dividing a Square Into Triangles", Selected Papers on Algebra, Raymond W. Brink selected mathematical papers, vol. 3, Mathematical Association of America, pp. 249–251, ISBN 978-0-88385-203-3
- Monsky, Paul (September 1990), "A conjecture of Stein on plane dissections", Mathematische Zeitschrift, 205 (1): 583–592, doi:10.1007/BF02571264, S2CID 122009844, Zbl 0693.51008
- Monsky, Paul (June–July 1996), "Calculating a Trapezoidal Spectrum", The American Mathematical Monthly, 103 (6): 500–501, doi:10.2307/2974718, JSTOR 2974718, Zbl 0856.51008
- Praton, Iwan (November 2002), "Cutting Polyominos into Equal-Area Triangles", American Mathematical Monthly, 109 (9): 818–826, doi:10.2307/3072370, JSTOR 3072370, Zbl 1026.05027
- Richman, Fred; Thomas, John (March 1967), "Problem 5471", American Mathematical Monthly, 74 (3): 328–329, doi:10.2307/2316055, JSTOR 2316055
- Rudenko, Daniil (2012), On equidissection of balanced polygons, arXiv:1206.4591, Bibcode:2012arXiv1206.4591R
- Sakai, T.; Nara, C.; Urrutia, J. (2005), "Equal Area Polygons in Convex Bodies" (PDF), in Jin Akiyama; Edy Tri Baskoro; Mikio Kano (eds.), Combinatorial Geometry and Graph Theory: Indonesia-Japan Joint Conference, IJCCGGT 2003, Bandung, Indonesia, September 13-16, 2003, Revised Selected Papers, Lecture Notes in Computer Science, vol. 3330, Springer, pp. 146–158, doi:10.1007/978-3-540-30540-8_17, ISBN 978-3-540-24401-1, Zbl 1117.52010
- Schulze, Bernd (1 July 2011), "On the area discrepancy of triangulations of squares and trapezoids", Electronic Journal of Combinatorics, 18 (1): #P137, doi:10.37236/624, Zbl 1222.52017
- Stein, Sherman K. (June 1989), "Equidissections of centrally symmetric octagons", Aequationes Mathematicae, 37 (2–3): 313–318, doi:10.1007/BF01836454, S2CID 120042596, Zbl 0681.52008
- Stein, Sherman K. (March 1999), "Cutting a Polyomino into Triangles of Equal Areas", American Mathematical Monthly, 106 (3): 255–257, doi:10.2307/2589681, JSTOR 2589681
- Stein, Sherman K. (December 2000), "A Generalized Conjecture about Cutting a Polygon into Triangles of Equal Areas", Discrete & Computational Geometry, 24 (1): 141–145, doi:10.1007/s004540010021, Zbl 0968.52011
- Su, Zhanjun (November 2002), "关于Stein猜想的局部证明 (A Local Proof on Stein's Conjectures)", Journal of Hebei Normal University (Natural Science Edition) (in Chinese), 26 (6): 559–560, Zbl 1038.52002
- Su, Zhanjun (2004), "关于一类特殊梯形的等面积三角形划分 (On Cutting a Family of Special Trapezoids into Triangles of Equal Areas)", Mathematics in Practice and Theory (in Chinese), 34 (1): 145–149
- Su, Zhanjun; Wang, Xinke; Tian, Huizhu (July 2002), "关于Stein猜想的研究 (Study on Stein's conjecture)", Journal of Hebei Normal University (Natural Science Edition) (in Chinese), 26 (4): 341–342, Zbl 1024.52002
- Su, Zhanjun; Wang, Xinke (November 2002), "关于多边形三角划分中的一个逼近问题 (An Approximation Problem About Cutting Polygons into Triangles)", Journal of Hebei Normal University (Natural Science) (in Chinese), 30 (4): 95–97, Zbl 1040.52002
- Su, Zhanjun; Wei, Xianglin; Liu, Fuyi (May 2003), "关于Stein猜想的推广 (A Generalization About a Conjecture of Stein)", Journal of Hebei Normal University (Natural Science Edition) (in Chinese), 27 (3): 223–224, Zbl 1036.52020
- Su, Zhanjun; Ding, Ren (September 2003), "Dissections of polygons into triangles of equal areas", Journal of Applied Mathematics and Computing, 13 (1–2): 29–36, doi:10.1007/BF02936072, S2CID 121587469, Zbl 1048.52011, archived from the original on 2005-01-18
- Su, Zhanjun; Ding, Ren (20 September 2004), "Cutting a Hyperpolyomino into Simplexes", Southeast Asian Bulletin of Mathematics, 28 (3): 573–576, Zbl 1067.52017
- Su, Zhanjun; Ding, Ren (2005), "四边形的等积三角剖分 (Dissections of Quadrilaterals into Triangles of Equal Areas)", Acta Mathematica Scientia (in Chinese), 25 (5): 718–721, Zbl 1098.52004, archived from the original on 2015-04-02
- Thomas, John (September 1968), "A Dissection Problem", Mathematics Magazine, 41 (4): 187–190, doi:10.2307/2689143, JSTOR 2689143, Zbl 0164.51502
