= Stanisław Gołąb =

Polish mathematician

- Born: July 26, 1902; Travnik
- Died: April 30, 1980 (aged 77); Kraków
- Education: Jagiellonian University
- Scientific career
- Fields: Mathematics
- Workplaces: Jagiellonian University
- Doctoral advisor: Stanisław Zaremba
- Doctoral students: Marek Kuczma

Stanisław Gołąb (July 26, 1902 – April 30, 1980) was a Polish mathematician from Kraków, working in particular on the field of affine geometry.

In 1932, he proved that the perimeter of the unit disc respect to a given metric can take any value in between 6 and 8, and that these extremal values are obtained if and only if the unit disc is an affine regular hexagon resp. a parallelogram.

He worked at the State Institute of Mathematics, which was incorporated into the Polish Academy of Sciences in 1952.

== Selected works ==
- S. Gołąb: Quelques problèmes métriques de la géometrie de Minkowski, Trav. de l'Acad. Mines Cracovie 6 (1932), 1–79
- Golab, S., Über einen algebraischen Satz, welcher in der Theorie der geometrischen Objekte auftritt, Beiträge zur Algebra und Geometrie 2 (1974) 7–10.
- Golab, S.; Swiatak, H.: Note on Inner Products in Vector Spaces. Aequationes Mathematicae (1972) 74.
- Golab, S.: Über das Carnotsche Skalarprodukt in schwach normierten Vektorräumen. Aequationes Mathematicae 13 (1975) 9–13.
- Golab, S., Sur un problème de la métrique angulaire dans la géometrie de Minkowski, Aequationes Mathematicae (1971) 121.
- Golab, S., Über die Grundlagen der affinen Geometrie., Jahresbericht DMV 71 (1969) 138–155.
