= Zonogon =

Convex polygon with pairs of equal, parallel sides

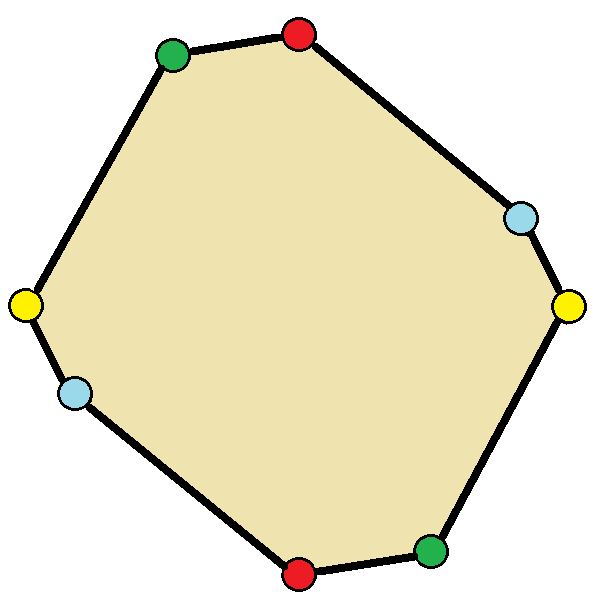
Octagonal zonogon

Tessellation by irregular hexagonal zonogons

Regular octagon tiled by squares and rhombi

In geometry, a zonogon is a centrally-symmetric, convex polygon. Equivalently, it is a convex polygon whose sides can be grouped into parallel pairs with equal lengths and opposite orientations, the two-dimensional analogue of a zonohedron, or the two-dimensional case of a zonotope.

== Examples ==
A regular polygon is a zonogon if and only if it has an even number of sides. Thus, the square, regular hexagon, and regular octagon are all zonogons. The four-sided zonogons are the square, the rectangles, the rhombi, and the parallelograms.

== Tiling and equidissection ==
The four-sided and six-sided zonogons are parallelogons, able to tile the plane by translated copies of themselves, and all convex parallelogons have this form. Zonogons with more than six sides do not tile the plane.

Every $2n$-sided zonogon can be tiled by $\tbinom{n}{2}$ parallelograms. (For equilateral zonogons, a $2n$-sided one can be tiled by $\tbinom{n}{2}$ rhombi.) In this tiling, there is a parallelogram for each pair of slopes of sides in the $2n$-sided zonogon. At least three of the zonogon's vertices must be vertices of only one of the parallelograms in any such tiling. For instance, the regular octagon can be tiled by two squares and four 45° rhombi.

In a generalization of Monsky's theorem, Paul Monsky (1990) proved that no zonogon has an equidissection into an odd number of equal-area triangles.

== Other properties ==
In an $n$-sided zonogon, at most $2n-3$ pairs of vertices can be at unit distance from each other. There exist $n$-sided zonogons with $2n-O(\sqrt{n})$ unit-distance pairs.

== Related shapes ==
Zonogons are the two-dimensional analogues of three-dimensional zonohedra and higher-dimensional zonotopes. As such, each zonogon can be generated as the Minkowski sum of a collection of line segments in the plane. If no two of the generating line segments are parallel, there will be one pair of parallel edges for each line segment. Every face of a zonohedron is a zonogon, and every zonogon is the face of at least one zonohedron, the prism over that zonogon. Additionally, every planar cross-section through the center of a centrally-symmetric polyhedron (such as a zonohedron) is a zonogon.
