= Deborah Tepper Haimo =

American mathematician (1921–2007)

Deborah Tepper Haimo (July 1, 1921 – May 17, 2007) was an American mathematician who became president of the Mathematical Association of America (MAA). Her research concerned "classical analysis, in particular, generalizations of the heat equation, special functions, and harmonic analysis".

== Early life and undergraduate education ==
Haimo was born on July 1, 1921, in Odessa, then part of the Soviet Union. After living in the British Mandate of Palestine for several years, her family moved to the United States when she was 11. She attended the Girls' Latin School in Boston, and first became excited by mathematics in her sophomore year, when she studied Euclidean geometry.

Entering Radcliffe College, she began studying physics, because she thought that studying mathematics could only lead to a career as a schoolteacher and, at that time, teachers were dismissed once they married. However, her experiences with unknown environmental influences in physics experiments led her back to mathematics, where "we have control over our assumptions". As an upper-division undergraduate at Radcliffe, Haimo could enroll in mathematics courses at Harvard College. Her instructors there included Hassler Whitney and Saunders Mac Lane, and it was in one of these classes that she met her future husband, Franklin Tepper Haimo. She graduated in 1943 from Radcliffe, with both a bachelor's and master's degree in mathematics.

== Career and graduate education ==
Next, Haimo worked as a mathematics instructor at a sequence of institutions: Lake Erie College, Northeastern University, Washington University in St. Louis, and Southern Illinois University. During this time, she also raised a family of five children. After a ten-year break from her education, she returned to graduate study while she taught at Washington University and Southern Illinois University, and completed her Ph.D. at Harvard University in 1964. Her dissertation, supervised by David Widder with additional unofficial mentorship from Isidore Isaac Hirschman Jr. of Washington University, was Integral Equations Associated With Hankel Convolutions.

On completing her doctorate, she was promoted to a regular-rank faculty member at Southern Illinois. She moved to the University of Missouri–St. Louis in 1968, soon becoming department chair there. She served as MAA president for 1991–1992, becoming the third female president of the MAA after Dorothy Lewis Bernstein and Lida Barrett. During her term as president, she created a teaching award, reorganized the MAA's committee structure, and worked to promote women in mathematics. She retired in 1992 and moved to La Jolla, California, where she took an appointment as a visiting scholar at the University of California, San Diego.

In 1993 she established the Deborah and Franklin Haimo Awards for Distinguished College or University Teaching of Mathematics, named after her and her husband Franklin Haimo.

== Death ==
She died on May 17, 2007.

== Awards and honors ==
Franklin & Marshall College gave Haimo an honorary doctorate in 1991.

She was named a Fellow of the American Association for the Advancement of Science in 1996.

Haimo was given the Yueh-Gin Gung and Dr. Charles Y. Hu Award for Distinguished Service to the MAA in 1997.
