= Neal Henry McCoy =

American mathematician, professor and author of textbooks

Neal Henry McCoy (March 6, 1905 – January 5, 2001) was an American mathematician, university professor, and author of several textbooks for mathematics undergraduates. His 1960 textbook Introduction to Modern Algebra has gone through several editions and has been translated into many foreign languages.

== Early life and education ==
McCoy was born into a homesteading family in Waukomis, Oklahoma (which was part of the Oklahoma Territory from 1890 to 1907). He had an older sister Dorothy McCoy (1903–2001), who became the first woman to receive a Ph.D. in mathematics from the University of Iowa. As an infant, he moved in 1906 with his mother and sister to Chesapeake, Missouri after the death of his father. After graduating with a bachelor's degree from Baylor University, he became a graduate student at the University of Iowa. There he graduated in 1929 with a Ph.D. in mathematics with adviser Edward Wilson Chittenden. McCoy's Ph.D. thesis On commutation formulas in the algebra of quantum mechanics was published in abbreviated form in the Transactions of the American Mathematical Society.

== Career ==
For two academic years from 1929 to 1931, McCoy studied at Princeton University as a National Research Fellow. He joined in 1931 the staff of the mathematics department of Northampton's Smith College, There he was promoted to full professor in 1942 and was appointed to the Gates Chair in Mathematics in 1963, retiring as professor emeritus in 1970. McCoy did research on abstract algebra, especially the theory of rings and matrices with elements in rings, and algebraic aspects of quantum mechanics. From 1951 to 1954 he was the editor-in-chief of the Duke Mathematical Journal. He was an associate editor for the American Mathematical Monthly and the Pi Mu Epsilon Journal.

== McCoy ring ==
In 1942, McCoy proved the following theorem:
Let R be a commutative ring with multiplicative unit, and let f(x) be a zero divisor in the polynomial ring R[x]. Then there is a nonzero element r ∈ R with f(x)r = 0.
In 1997 Mangesh B. Rege and Sima Chhawchharia introduced definitions of rings, which in 2006, independently and motivated by McCoy's 1942 theorem, were re-introduced by Pace P. Nielsen, who gave the concepts the names "right McCoy ring", "left McCoy ring", and "McCoy ring" (a ring which is both right McCoy and left McCoy).

== Rings and Ideals (1948) ==
McCoy wrote the 8th book in the series of Carus Mathematical Monographs published by the Mathematical Association of America. The book is almost entirely self-contained. In a 1948 review, André Weil praised the book for the optimized simplicity of the mathematical proofs, an "easy and readable style", and "skillful use of examples". In a 1949 review, C. C. MacDuffee praised the book — "as an introduction to the powerful and highly abstract method of thinking which now characterizes modern algebra, it is a gem."

== Personal life ==
In 1929 in Iowa, Neal H. McCoy married Ardis Hollingsworth (1904–1988). Their only son, Paul Albert McCoy, was killed in 1957 at age 22 in an automobile accident.

== Selected publications ==
=== Articles ===
- McCoy, Neal H. (1929). "On Commutation Rules in the Algebra of Quantum Mechanics". Proceedings of the National Academy of Sciences of the United States of America. 15 (3): 200–202. Bibcode:1929PNAS...15..200M. doi:10.1073/pnas.15.3.200. JSTOR 85232. PMC 522434. PMID 16577167.
- McCoy, Neal H. (1932). "On the Function in Quantum Mechanics Which Corresponds to a Given Function in Classical Mechanics". Proceedings of the National Academy of Sciences. 18 (11): 674–676. Bibcode:1932PNAS...18..674M. doi:10.1073/pnas.18.11.674. PMC 1076309. PMID 16577495.
- McCoy, Neal H. (1934). "On quasi-commutative matrices". Transactions of the American Mathematical Society. 36 (2): 327–340. doi:10.1090/s0002-9947-1934-1501746-8.
- McCoy, N. H. (1936). "On the characteristic roots of matric polynomials" (PDF). Bulletin of the American Mathematical Society. 42 (8): 592–600. doi:10.1090/s0002-9904-1936-06372-X. (See characteristic root and matrix polynomial.)
- McCoy, N. H.; Montgomery, Deane (1937). "A representation of generalized Boolean rings". Duke Mathematical Journal. 3 (3). doi:10.1215/S0012-7094-37-00335-1.
- McCoy, Neal H. (1938). "Subrings of infinite direct sums". Duke Mathematical Journal. 4 (3). doi:10.1215/S0012-7094-38-00441-7.
- McCoy, Neal H. (1939). "A theorem on matrices over a commutative ring". Bulletin of the American Mathematical Society. 45 (10): 740–744. doi:10.1090/s0002-9904-1939-07070-5.
- McCoy, Neal H. (1939). "Concerning matrices with elements in a commutative ring". Bulletin of the American Mathematical Society. 45 (4): 280–284. doi:10.1090/s0002-9904-1939-06957-7.
- McCoy, N. H. (1939). "Generalized regular rings" (PDF). Bulletin of the American Mathematical Society. 45 (2): 175–178. doi:10.1090/s0002-9904-1939-06933-4.
- McCoy, N. H. (1942). "Remarks on Divisors of Zero". The American Mathematical Monthly. 49 (5): 286–295. doi:10.1080/00029890.1942.11991226.
- McCoy, Neal H. (1945). "Subdirectly irreducible commutative rings". Duke Mathematical Journal. 12 (2). doi:10.1215/S0012-7094-45-01232-4.
- Brown, Bailey; McCoy, Neal H. (1946). "Rings with unit element which contain a given ring". Duke Mathematical Journal. 13. doi:10.1215/s0012-7094-46-01302-6.
- Brown, Bailey; McCoy, Neal H. (1947). "Radicals and Subdirect Sums". American Journal of Mathematics. 69 (1): 46–58. doi:10.2307/2371653. JSTOR 2371653.
- McCoy, Neal H. (1947). "Subdirect sums of rings". Bulletin of the American Mathematical Society. 53 (9): 856–877. doi:10.1090/s0002-9904-1947-08867-4.
- McCoy, Neal H. (1949). "Prime Ideals in General Rings". American Journal of Mathematics. 71 (4): 823–833. doi:10.2307/2372366. JSTOR 2372366.
- Brown, Bailey; McCoy, Neal H. (1950). "Some theorems on groups with applications to ring theory". Transactions of the American Mathematical Society. 69: 302–311. doi:10.1090/S0002-9947-1950-0038952-7.
- McCoy, Neal H. (1957). "A note on finite unions of ideals and subgroups". Proceedings of the American Mathematical Society. 8 (4): 633–637. doi:10.1090/s0002-9939-1957-0086803-9.
- Brown, Bailey; McCoy, Neal H. (1958). "Prime ideals in nonassociative rings". Transactions of the American Mathematical Society. 89: 245–255. doi:10.1090/s0002-9947-1958-0096713-4.

== Books ==
- McCoy, N. H. (1948). Rings and ideals. Carus Mathematical Monograph, No. 8. Buffalo, New York: Mathematical Association of America. LCCN 48023679. File:Rings and ideals, by Neal H. McCoy, 1948.pdf
- McCoy, N. H.; Johnson, Richard E. (1955). Analytic geometry. New York: Rinehart. LCCN 55006188.
- McCoy, N. H. (1960). Introduction to modern algebra. Boston: Allyn and Bacon. LCCN 60011416.
  - Revised edition. 1968. LCCN 68015225.
  - Fundamentals of abstract algebra. 1972. LCCN 72183215; expanded version of revised edition
  - McCoy, Neal Henry (1975). 3rd edition. Allyn and Bacon. ISBN 0205045456. LCCN 74019140.
  - 4th edition. 1987. ISBN 0205102670. LCCN 86014193.
  - McCoy, Neal Henry (1992). 5th edition. Wm. C. Brown Publishers. ISBN 0697085708. LCCN 91070300; with Gerald J. Janusz as coauthor
  - McCoy, Neil; Janusz, Gerald (2001). Introduction to abstract algebra (6th ed.). Elsevier Science. ISBN 0123803926. LCCN 00108489; with Gerald J. Janusz as coauthor
  - McCoy, Neal Henry; Janusz, Gerald J. (2009). Introduction to abstract algebra (7th ed.). Trustworthy Communications, LLC. ISBN 978-0982263310; with Gerald J. Janusz as coauthor
- McCoy, N. H. (1964). Theory of rings. New York: Macmillan. LCCN 64012170.
- McCoy, N. H. (1965). Theory of numbers. New York: Macmillan. LCCN 65016557.
- McCoy, N. H. (1973). Theory of rings. Bronx, N.Y.: Chelsea Publishing Company. LCCN 72011558.
- McCoy, N. H.; Berger, Thomas R. (1977). Algebra: groups, rings, and other topics. Boston: Allyn and Bacon. ISBN 0205056997. LCCN 76056743.
