= Carus Mathematical Monographs =

The Carus Mathematical Monographs is a monograph series published by the Mathematical Association of America. Books in this series are intended to appeal to a wide range of readers in mathematics and science.

== Scope and audience ==
While the books are intended to cover nontrivial material, the emphasis is on exposition and clear communication rather than novel results and a systematic Bourbaki-style presentation. The webpage for the series states:

The exposition of mathematical subjects that the monographs contain are set forth in a manner comprehensible not only to teachers and students specializing in mathematics, but also to scientific workers in other fields. More generally, the monographs are intended for the wide circle of thoughtful people familiar with basic graduate or advanced undergraduate mathematics encountered in the study of mathematics itself or in the context of related disciplines who wish to extend their knowledge without prolonged and critical study of the mathematical journals and treatises.

Many of the books in the series have become classics in the genre of general mathematical exposition.

== Series listing ==
1. Calculus of Variations, by G. A. Bliss (out of print)
2. Analytic Functions of a Complex Variable, by D. R. Curtiss (out of print)
3. Mathematical Statistics, by H. L. Rietz (out of print)
4. Projective Geometry, by J. W. Young (out of print)
5. A History of Mathematics in America before 1900, by D. E. Smith and Jekuthiel Ginsburg (out of print)
6. Fourier Series and Orthogonal Polynomials, by Dunham Jackson - ISBN 978-1258812799 (out of print)
7. Vectors and Matrices, by C. C. MacDuffee (out of print)
8. Rings and Ideals, by N. H. McCoy (out of print)
9. The Theory of Algebraic Numbers, second edition, by Harry Pollard and Harold G. Diamond - ISBN 9780883850183
10. The Arithmetic Theory of Quadratic Forms, by B. W. Jones (out of print)
11. Irrational Numbers, by Ivan Niven - ISBN 9780883850114
12. Statistical Independence in Probability, Analysis and Number Theory, by Mark Kac
13. A Primer of Real Functions, third edition, by Ralph P. Boas, Jr. - ISBN 978-0883850299
14. Combinatorial Mathematics, by Herbert John Ryser - ISBN 0-88385-014-1
15. Noncommutative Rings, by I. N. Herstein - ISBN 0-88385-015-X - (out of print)
16. Dedekind Sums, by Hans Rademacher and Emil Grosswald - ISBN 9780883850169 (out of print)
17. The Schwarz Function and its Applications, by Philip J. Davis - ISBN 9780883850176
18. Celestial Mechanics, by Harry Pollard - ISBN 9780883850190 (out of print)
19. Field Theory and its Classical Problems, by Charles Robert Hadlock - ISBN 9780883850206
20. The Generalized Riemann Integral, by Robert M. McLeod - ISBN 9780883850213 (out of print)
21. From Error-Correcting Codes through Sphere Packings to Simple Groups, by Thomas M. Thompson - ISBN 9780883850237
22. Random Walks and Electric Networks, by Peter G. Doyle and J. Laurie Snell, ISBN 9780883850244
23. Complex Analysis: The Geometric Viewpoint, by Steven G. Krantz - ISBN 978-0883850350
24. Knot Theory, by Charles Livingston - ISBN 978-0883850275
25. Algebra and Tiling: Homomorphisms in the Service of Geometry, by Sherman K. Stein and Sándor Szabó - ISBN 9780883850282
26. The Sensual (Quadratic) Form, by John H. Conway assisted by Francis Y. C. Fung, 1997, ISBN 978-0-88385-030-5
27. A Panorama of Harmonic Analysis, by Steven G. Krantz, 1999, ISBN 978-0-88385-031-2
28. Inequalities from Complex Analysis, by John P. D'Angelo, 2002, ISBN 978-0-88385-033-6
29. Ergodic Theory of Numbers, by Karma Dajani and Cor Kraaikamp, 2002, ISBN 978-0-88385-034-3
30. A Tour through Mathematical Logic, by Robert S. Wolf, 2005, ISBN 978-0-88385-036-7
31. Randomness and Recurrence in Dynamical Systems: a Real Analysis Approach, by Rodney Nillsen, 2010, ISBN 978-0-88385-043-5
32. Linear Inverse Problems and Tikhonov Regularization, by Mark S. Gockenbach, 2016, ISBN 978-0-88385-141-8
33. Near the Horizon: An Invitation to Geometric Optics, by Henk W. Broer, 2017, ISBN 978-0-88385-142-5
34. Finding Ellipses: What Blaschke Products, Poncelet’s Theorem, and the Numerical Range Know about Each Other, by Ulrich Daepp, Pamela Gorkin, Andrew Shaffer, and Karl Voss, 2018, ISBN 978-1-4704-4383-2
35. Field Theory and Its Classical Problems, by Charles Robert Hadlock (reprint of #19)
36. The Unity of Combinatorics, by Ezra Brown and Richard K. Guy, 2020, ISBN 978-1-4704-5279-7
37. The Finite Field Distance Problem, by David J. Covert, 2021, ISBN 978-1-4704-6031-0
38. Ergodic Theory, by Simon Rubinstein-Salzedo, 2025, ISBN 978-1-4704-7920-6

== See also ==
- Carus Lectures
