= Euler's theorem in geometry =

On distance between centers of a triangle

Euler's theorem: $d=|IO| =\sqrt{R (R-2r)}$

In geometry, Euler's theorem states that the distance d between the circumcenter and incenter of a triangle is given by
$$d^2=R (R-2r)$$
or equivalently
$$\frac{1}{R-d} + \frac{1}{R+d} = \frac{1}{r},$$
where $R$ and $r$ denote the circumradius and inradius respectively (the radii of the circumscribed circle and inscribed circle respectively). The theorem is named for Leonhard Euler, who published it in 1765. However, the same result was published earlier by William Chapple in 1746.

From the theorem follows the Euler inequality:
$$R \ge 2r,$$
which holds with equality only in the equilateral case.

== Proof ==
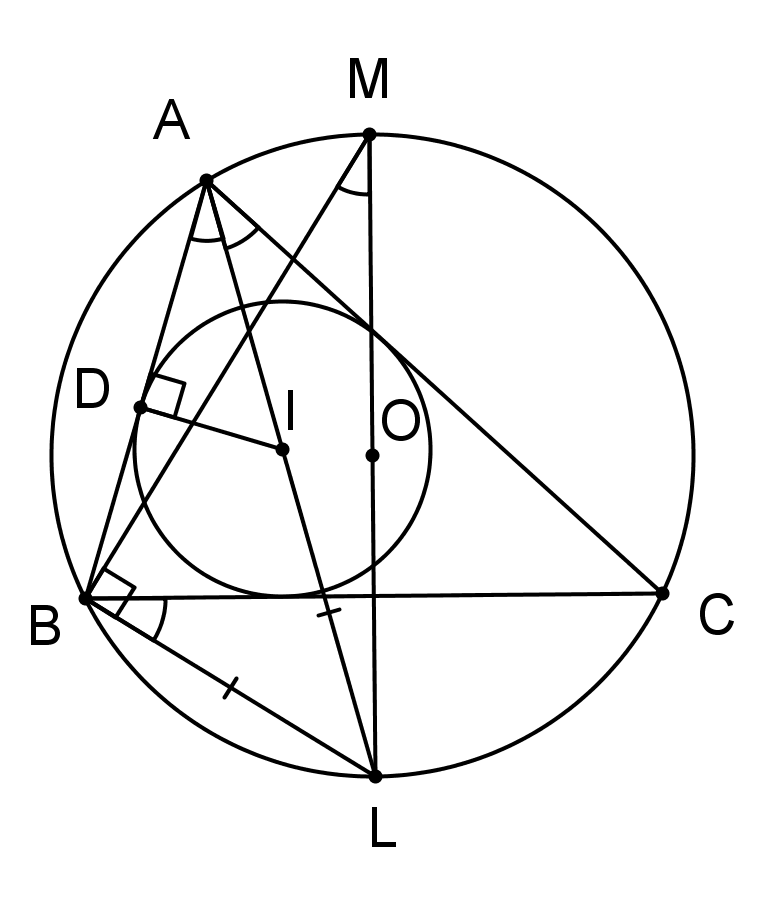
Proof of Euler's theorem

Let $O$ be the center of the circumcircle of triangle $ABC$, and let $I$ be the center of its incircle.

If the ray $AI$ intersects the circumcircle at the point $L$, then $L$ is the midpoint of arc $BC$. Draw the ray $LO$ and denote its intersection with the circumcircle by $M$.

Then $LM$ is a diameter of the circumcircle. Drop the perpendicular $ID$ from the point $I$ to $AB$. Then $ID = r$. Rewrite Euler's formula in the following form:

$$d^2 - R^2 = -2rR$$

Notice that the left-hand side is the power of the point $I$ with respect to the circumcircle.

Therefore, it suffices to prove the equality $LI \cdot IA = 2Rr$.

By the trident lemma, $LI = LB,$ so it suffices to prove that $LB \cdot IA = 2Rr$.

Now observe that $2R = LM$ and $r = ID,$ that is, the required equality can be rewritten as $LB \cdot IA = LM \cdot ID.$ Rewriting it once more, we obtain $LB / LM = ID / IA$.

This equality follows from the similarity of triangles $\triangle AID$ and $\triangle MLB$.

Indeed, the angles at $B$ and $D$ in these triangles are right angles, while the angles at $A$ and $M$ are equal because they both subtend the arc $BL$ (moreover, the ratio $LB / LM = ID / IA$ is equal to the sine of the angle $\angle BAL$).

== Stronger version of the inequality ==
A stronger version is
$$\frac{R}{r} \geq \frac{abc+a^3+b^3+c^3}{2abc} \geq \frac{a}{b}+\frac{b}{c}+\frac{c}{a}-1 \geq \frac{2}{3} \left(\frac{a}{b}+\frac{b}{c}+\frac{c}{a} \right) \geq 2,$$
where $a$, $b$, and $c$ are the side lengths of the triangle.

== Euler's theorem for the escribed circle ==
If $r_a$ and $d_a$ denote respectively the radius of the escribed circle opposite to the vertex $A$ and the distance between its center and the center of the circumscribed circle, then $d_a^2=R(R+2r_a)$.

== Euler's inequality in absolute geometry ==
Euler's inequality, in the form stating that, for all triangles inscribed in a given circle, the maximum of the radius of the inscribed circle is reached for the equilateral triangle and only for it, is valid in absolute geometry.

== See also ==
- Fuss' theorem for the relation among the same three variables in bicentric quadrilaterals
- Poncelet's closure theorem, showing that there is an infinity of triangles with the same two circles (and therefore the same R, r, and d)
- Egan conjecture, generalization to higher dimensions
- List of triangle inequalities
