= Pamela Gorkin =

American mathematician

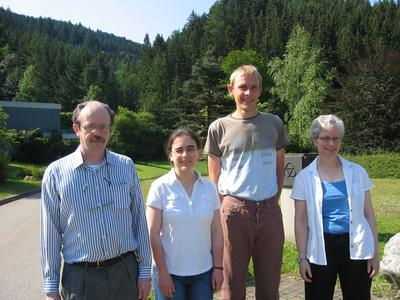
From left: Raymond Mortini, Sophie Grivaux, Frederic Bayart, and Pamela Gorkin, 2006 at the MFO

Pamela Gorkin is an American mathematician specializing in complex analysis and operator theory. She was a professor of mathematics at Bucknell University, now working as an editor for a mathematics journal.

== Education and career ==
Gorkin earned bachelor's and master's degrees in statistics from Michigan State University in 1976. She then shifted to pure mathematics for her doctoral studies, completing her Ph.D. at Michigan State in 1982, the same year she joined the Bucknell Faculty. Her dissertation, Decompositions of the Maximal Ideal Space of L, was supervised by Sheldon Axler.

At Bucknell University, Gorkin was Presidential Professor from 2001 to 2004. She also spent time as a Guest Professor at Université de Metz and Universität Bern. She remained a professor in the Bucknell University Department of Mathematics through the 2020 Spring Semester. Now she is recognized as a Professor Emerita at Bucknell and holds the position of Associate Editor at The Mathematical Intelligencer, where she continues to publish works on mathematics, as of August 2026.

== Books ==
With Ulrich Daepp, Gorkin is the author of the undergraduate textbook Reading, Writing, and Proving: A Closer Look at Mathematics (Springer, 2003; 2nd ed., 2011). This book is meant to aid students in their transition from calculus to higher levels of mathematics. It walks students through Pólya's four step approach, introduced in his book How to Solve It, to mathematical proofs, with emphasis on carefully reading proofs and writing them well. The text includes mindfully written examples, exercises, illustrations, and historical connections, to help students make their own connections and understanding of the topics. While specifically tailored to preparing students for algebra-related courses, it also includes chapters on other topics to allow students to transition from standard calculus to analysis topics.

With Daepp, Andrew Shaffer, and Karl Voss, she is the author of Finding Ellipses: What Blaschke Products, Poncelet’s Theorem, and the Numerical Range Know about Each Other (Carus Mathematical Monographs, MAA Press, 2018). The book studies a connection between Blaschke products, Poncelet's closure theorem, and the numerical range of matrices. A Blaschke product is a certain kind of mapping of the unit disk in the complex plane to itself, and the ones considered in the first part of the book have order three (they map the unit circle three-to-one to itself, so that each point on the unit circle has three preimages). These triples of preimages form triangles that are all inscribed in the unit circle, and (it turns out) they all circumscribe an ellipse. Thus, they form an infinite system of polygons inscribed in and circumscribing two conics, as Poncelet's theorem describes. The ellipse is the boundary of the numerical range of a certain matrix derived from the Blaschke product, a region within which the eigenvalues of the matrix can be found, and in this case the eigenvalues are at the foci of the ellipse. The book tells "a story of discovery" outlining these connections, extends similar results to Blaschke products of higher order, and outlines a plan for further research in this area.

== Recognition ==
Gorkin was the 2018 AWM/MAA Falconer Lecturer. Her lecture was on "Finding Ellipses", the topic of one of her books. She is also the recipient of Bucknell's Lindback Award for Distinguished Teaching, and the Crawford Distinguished Teaching Award of the Mathematical Association of America.

She later won the 2025 Mary P. Dolciani Prize for Excellence in Research, awarded by the American Mathematical Society (AMS). This was awarded to recognize her record of high-quality research in mathematical analysis, work with undergraduates, and service to the profession. Specifically recognized for her work that involves "problems about interpolation, the numerical range, and composition of operators."
