= Edward Dougherty =

Edward Dougherty may refer to:

- Edward Emmett Dougherty (1876–1943), architect in the southeastern United States
- Edward R. Dougherty (born 1945), American mathematician and electrical engineer
- Eduardo Dougherty (Edward John Dougherty), American-Brazilian Jesuit priest and educator
