= Elaine Kasimatis =

American mathematician (1952–2021)

- Born: May 25, 1952; Bakersfield, California, U.S.
- Died: September 7, 2021 (aged 69); Davis, California, U.S.

Elaine Ann Kasimatis (May 25, 1952 – September 7, 2021) was an American mathematician specializing in discrete geometry and mathematics education. She was a professor in the Department of Mathematics & Statistics at California State University, Sacramento.

== Education and career ==
Kasimatis was educated at the University of California, Davis. She earned a bachelor's degree in mathematics there in 1976, and a master's degree in mathematics education in 1979. She returned to Davis for graduate study in pure mathematics, earning a second master's degree in 1983 and completing her Ph.D. in 1986. Her dissertation, Dissection of Regular Polygons into Triangles of Equal Areas, was supervised by Sherman K. Stein.

She joined the faculty at California State University, Sacramento in 1986.

== Contributions ==
Kasimatis was known for her work on equidissection, the subdivision of polygons into triangles of equal area; with Stein, she made the first studies of equidissections of regular pentagons, and introduced the concept of the equidissection spectrum of a polygon.

She was also the author of an algebra textbook, Making Sense of Elementary Algebra: Data, Equations, and Graphs, with Cindy L. Erickson, Addison-Wesley, 1999.

== Recognition ==
Kasimitis was one of the 2021 winners of the Deborah and Franklin Haimo Awards for Distinguished College or University Teaching of Mathematics of the Mathematical Association of America. The award cited her "major role in developing the first program in California to integrate mathematics content with teacher preparation", her mentorship of student teachers, her development of the middle-school Access to Algebra program and the College Preparatory Mathematics program, both used nationally, and her volunteer work developing mathematics education in Rwanda.
