= Egan conjecture =

Conjecture in geometry

In geometry, the Egan conjecture gives a sufficient and necessary condition for the radii of two spheres and the distance of their centers, so that a simplex exists, which is completely contained inside the larger sphere and completely encloses the smaller sphere. The conjecture generalizes an equality discovered by William Chapple (and later independently by Leonhard Euler), which is a special case of Poncelet's closure theorem, as well as the Grace–Danielsson inequality in one dimension higher.

The conjecture was proposed in 2014 by the Australian mathematician and science-fiction author Greg Egan. The "sufficient" part was proved in 2018, and the "necessary" part was proved in 2023.

== Basics ==
For an arbitrary triangle ($2$-simplex), the radius $r$ of its inscribed circle, the radius $R$ of its circumcircle and the distance $d$ of their centers are related through Euler's theorem in geometry:

$$d^2=R(R-2r)$$,

which was published by William Chapple in 1746 and by Leonhard Euler in 1765.

For two spheres ($2$-spheres) with respective radii $r$ and $R$, fulfilling $r<R$, there exists a (non-regular) tetrahedron ($3$-simplex), which is completely contained inside the larger sphere and completely encloses the smaller sphere, if and only if the distance $d$ of their centers fulfills the Grace–Danielsson inequality:

$$d^2\leq(R+r)(R-3r)$$.

This result was independently proven by John Hilton Grace in 1917 and G. Danielsson in 1949. A connection of the inequality with quantum information theory was described by Anthony Milne.

== Conjecture ==
Consider $n$-dimensional euclidean space $\mathbb R^n$ for $n\geq 2$. For two $n-1$-spheres with respective radii $r$ and $R$, fulfilling $r<R$, there exists a $n$-simplex, which is completely contained inside the larger sphere and completely encloses the smaller sphere, if and only if the distance $d$ of their centers fulfills:

$$d^2\leq(R+(n-2)r)(R-nr)$$.

The conjecture was proposed by Greg Egan in 2014.

For the case $n=1$, where the inequality reduces to $d\leq R-r$, the conjecture is true as well, but trivial. A $0$-sphere is just composed of two points and a $1$-simplex is just a closed interval. The desired $1$-simplex of two given $0$-spheres can simply be chosen as the closed interval between the two points of the larger sphere, which contains the smaller sphere if and only if it contains both of its points with respective distance $|d-r|$ and $d+r$ from the center of the larger sphere, hence if and only if the above inequality is satisfied.

== Status ==
Greg Egan showed that the condition is sufficient in comments on a blog post by John Baez in 2014. The comments were lost in a rearrangement of the website, but the central parts were copied into the original blog post. Further comments by Greg Egan on 16 April 2018 concern the search for a generalized conjecture involving ellipsoids. Sergei Drozdov published a paper on ArXiv showing that the condition is also necessary in October 2023.
