= Dorothy McCoy =

American mathematician (1903–2001)

- Born: August 9, 1903; Waukomis, Oklahoma, U.S.
- Died: November 21, 2001 (aged 98)
- Education: Baylor University; University of Iowa
- Occupations: Mathematician; professor
- Relatives: Neal Henry McCoy (brother)

Dorothy McCoy (August 9, 1903 – November 21, 2001) was an American mathematician and university professor. She was the first woman to earn a doctorate in mathematics from the University of Iowa, and she worked for many years as a professor of mathematics at Belhaven College and Wayland Baptist College.

== Early life and education ==
McCoy was born on August 9, 1903, in Waukomis, Oklahoma, then part of the Oklahoma Territory, one of two children of a homesteading family. She and the rest of the family moved to Chesapeake, Missouri, in 1906 after the death of her father. She received a bachelor's degree from Baylor University in Texas with distinction, worked for a year as a mathematics teacher, and completed a doctorate in mathematics from the University of Iowa in 1929, under the supervision of Edward Wilson Chittenden. Her dissertation was The Complete Existential Theory of Eight Fundamental Properties of Topological Spaces. She earned both degrees at the same time as her younger brother, Neal, who became a professor of mathematics at Smith College. She became the first woman to earn a doctorate in mathematics at the University of Iowa, and (with Winifred Asprey, Barbara Beechler, and Kathryn Powell Ellis) one of only four who did so before 1960.

== Later life and career ==
McCoy became professor and head of the mathematics department at Belhaven College in Mississippi in 1929, and chaired the Louisiana–Mississippi Section of the Mathematical Association of America in 1937 and 1938. In 1949 she became professor of mathematics and chair of the division of physical and biological sciences at Wayland Baptist College. She was a Fulbright Scholar in 1954, visiting Iraq, and later traveled professionally to many other countries. She also consulted for the US government's missile defense program. She retired as distinguished professor emerita in 1975, "the only member of the faculty to have received the title of both emeritus and distinguished".

She died on November 21, 2001.

== Recognition ==
The Wayland Baptist Association of Former Students gave McCoy their Distinguished Lifetime Service Award in 1999. Wayland Baptist named a dorm in her honor in 2001, and displays a bust of her in one of its buildings.

Two photographs of her are included in the collection of the National Museum of American History, as part of a set of photos on women with doctorates in mathematics.
