= Algebra and Tiling =

Textbook on the use of group theory in studying tessellations

Algebra and Tiling: Homomorphisms in the Service of Geometry
- Author: Sherman K. Stein and Sándor Szabó
- Series: Carus Mathematical Monographs
- Genre: Mathematics
- Publisher: Mathematical Association of America
- Publication date: 1994

Algebra and Tiling: Homomorphisms in the Service of Geometry is a mathematics textbook on the use of group theory to answer questions about tessellations and higher dimensional honeycombs, partitions of the Euclidean plane or higher-dimensional spaces into congruent tiles. It was written by Sherman K. Stein and Sándor Szabó, and published by the Mathematical Association of America as volume 25 of their Carus Mathematical Monographs series in 1994. It won the 1998 Beckenbach Book Prize, and was reprinted in paperback in 2008.

== Topics ==
The seven chapters of the book are largely self-contained, and consider different problems combining tessellations and algebra. Throughout the book, the history of the subject as well as the state of the art is discussed, and there are many illustrations.

The first chapter concerns a conjecture of Hermann Minkowski that, in any lattice tiling of a Euclidean space by unit hypercubes (a tiling in which a lattice of translational symmetries takes any hypercube to any other hypercube) some two cubes must meet face-to-face. This result was resolved positively by Hajós's theorem in group theory, but a generalization of this question to non-lattice tilings (Keller's conjecture) was disproved shortly before the publication of the book, in part by using similar group-theoretic methods.

Following this, three chapters concern lattice tilings by polycubes. The question here is to determine, from the shape of the polycube, whether all cubes in the tiling meet face-to-face or, equivalently, whether the lattice of symmetries must be a subgroup of the integer lattice. After a chapter on the general version of this problem, two chapters consider special classes of cross and "semicross"-shaped polycubes, both with regard to tiling and then, when these shapes do not tile, with regard to how densely they can be packed. In three dimensions, this is the notorious tripod packing problem.

Chapter five considers Monsky's theorem on the impossibility of partitioning a square into an odd number of equal-area triangles, and its proof using the 2-adic valuation, and chapter six applies Galois theory to more general problems of tiling polygons by congruent triangles, such as the impossibility of tiling a square with 30-60-90 right triangles.

The final chapter returns to the topic of the first, with material on László Rédei's generalization of Hajós's theorem. Appendices cover background material on lattice theory, exact sequences, free abelian groups, and the theory of cyclotomic polynomials.

== Audience and reception ==
Algebra and Tiling can be read by undergraduate or graduate mathematics students who have some background in abstract algebra, and provides a source of applications for this topic. It can be used as a textbook, with exercises scattered throughout its chapters.

Reviewer William J. Walton writes that "The student or mathematician whose area of interest is algebra should enjoy this text". In 1998, the Mathematical Association of America gave it their Beckenbach Book Prize as one of the best of their book publications. The award citation called it "a simultaneously erudite and inviting ex- position of this substantial and timeless area of mathematics".
