= Lee Albert Rubel =

American mathematician

- Born: December 1, 1928
- Died: March 25, 1995 (aged 66)
- Education: University of Wisconsin-Madison
- Known for: Analog computing
- Scientific career
- Fields: Mathematics
- Workplaces: University of Illinois at Urbana-Champaign
- Thesis: Entire Functions and Ostrowski Sequences (1954)
- Doctoral advisor: Robert Creighton Buck

Lee Albert Rubel (December 1, 1928 – March 25, 1995) was a mathematician known for his contributions to analog computing.

== Career ==
Originally from New York, he held a Doctorate of Mathematics degree from University of Wisconsin-Madison, and was professor of mathematics at University of Illinois at Urbana-Champaign since 1954.

He wrote for several scientific publications like the Complex Variables and Elliptic Equations International Journal, the Constructive Approximation mathematical journal, the American Mathematical Monthly, the Journal of Differential Equations, the Journal of Approximation Theory, the Journal of Symbolic Logic, the Journal of the Australian Mathematical Society. He also collaborated to the Functional Analysis periodical, the Tohoku Mathematical, the Mathematical Proceedings of the Cambridge Philosophical Society, the Franklin Institute-engineering and Applied Mathematics, Combinatorica, Israel Journal of Mathematics, and Journal of Theoretical Neurobiology, among others.

He was a member of the American Mathematical Society for 43 years, which published many of his papers in the Proceedings of the American Mathematical Society.

He died on March 25, 1995, in Urbana, Illinois.
