= Harry Pollard (mathematician) =

American mathematician

- Born: 28 February 1919
- Died: 20 November 1985 (aged 66)
- Education: Harvard University
- Scientific career
- Fields: Celestial mechanics
- Workplaces: Cornell University; Purdue University
- Doctoral advisor: David Widder
- Doctoral students: Louis de Branges; Joanne Elliott; Donald G. Saari

Harry Pollard (28 February 1919 – November 20, 1985) was an American mathematician. He received his PhD from Harvard University in 1942 under the supervision of David Widder. He then taught at Cornell University, and was professor of mathematics at Purdue University from 1961 until his death in 1985. He is known for his work on celestial mechanics, orthogonal polynomials and the n-body problem as well as for the several textbooks he authored or co-authored. In the theory of Orthogonal polynomials, Pollard solved a conjecture of Antoni Zygmund, establishing mean convergence of the partial sums in $L^p$ norms for the Legendre polynomials and Jacobi polynomials in a series of three papers in the Transactions of the American Mathematical Society. The first of these papers deals with the fundamental case of Legendre polynomials. The end point case in Pollard's theorem was established by Sagun Chanillo.

== Books ==
- Pollard, Harry; Diamond, Harold G. (1975), The Theory of Algebraic Numbers, Carus Mathematical Monographs, vol. 9 (2nd ed.), MAA. Originally published 1950. 3rd edition, 1998 Dover reprint.
- Pollard, Harry (1972), Applied Mathematics: An Introduction, Addison-Wesley.
- Pollard, Harry (1976), Celestial Mechanics, Carus Mathematical Monographs, vol. 18, MAA, ISBN 0-88385-019-2
- Tenenbaum, Morris; Pollard, Harry (1985), Ordinary Differential Equations, Dover, ISBN 0-486-64940-7.
