= Robert Creighton Buck =

American mathematician

Robert Creighton Buck (30 August 1920 Cincinnati – 1 February 1998 Wisconsin), usually cited as R. Creighton Buck, was an American mathematician who, with Ralph Boas, introduced Boas–Buck polynomials. He taught at University of Wisconsin–Madison for 40 years. In addition, he was a writer.

== Biography ==
Buck was born in Cincinnati. He studied at the University of Cincinnati and then earned his PhD in 1947 at Harvard University under David Widder and Ralph Boas with dissertation Uniqueness, Interpolation and Characterization Theorems for Functions of Exponential Type. For three years he was an assistant professor at Brown University, before he became in 1950 an associate professor at the University of Wisconsin, Madison, where he was promoted to professor in 1954. In 1973, he became the acting director of the University of Wisconsin Army Mathematics Research Center when J. Barkley Rosser retired. At Madison he became in 1980 "Hilldale Professor" and from 1964 to 1966 he was chair of the mathematics department. In 1990 he retired as professor emeritus but remained mathematically active.

Buck worked on approximation theory, complex analysis, topological algebra, and operations research. He worked for six years for the Institute for Defense Analyses in operations research. Buck wrote, in collaboration with Ellen F. Buck, a textbook Advanced Calculus, commonly used in U.S. colleges and universities. He also worked on the history of mathematics. For his essay Sherlock Holmes in Babylon he won the Lester Randolph Ford Award. His doctoral students include Lee Rubel and Thomas W. Hawkins, a well-known historian of mathematics.

Buck was vice-president of the American Mathematical Society and the Mathematical Association of America (MAA), whose "Committee on the Undergraduate Program in Mathematics“ (CUPM) he founded and from 1959 to 1963 chaired. In 1962 he was an invited speaker (Global solutions of differential equations) at the International Congress of Mathematicians in Stockholm.

Buck was an accomplished amateur pianist and at age 18 won a prize for composition for piano. He wrote several science fiction stories.

At age 77, he died at his home in Winconsin on February 1, 1998.

== Publications ==
- Advanced Calculus, McGraw Hill, New York 1956, 3rd edn. Waveland Press, 2003
- with Ralph Boas: Polynomial expansions of analytic functions, Springer 1958, 2nd edn, Academic Press, Springer 1964
- with Ellen F. Buck: Introduction to differential equations, Boston, Houghton Mifflin 1978
- with Alfred Willcox: Calculus of several variables, Houghton Mifflin 1971
- “Sherlock Holmes in Babylon”, AMM 1980
