= Joanne Elliott =

American mathematician (1925–2023)

Joanne Elliott (December 5, 1925 – March 5, 2023) was an American mathematician who specialized in potential theory, who was described as a "disciple" of her co-author, probability theorist William Feller. She was also a professor of mathematics at Rutgers University.

== Early life and education ==
Elliott was born on December 5, 1925, in Providence, Rhode Island, and graduated from Brown University in 1947. She completed her Ph.D. at Cornell University in 1950, as part of a handful of "outstanding graduate students" working at Cornell in the post-World-War-II decade. Her dissertation, On Some Singular Integral Equations of the Cauchy Type, was supervised by Harry Pollard.

== Career and later life ==
After a year at Swarthmore College, she worked at Mount Holyoke College as an assistant professor from 1952 until 1956, when she moved to Barnard College. In 1958, she was the supervisor of Doris Stockton's doctorate at Brown University. In 1961, as an associate professor at Barnard, she was funded by the National Science Foundation to visit the Institute for Advanced Study in Princeton, New Jersey for postdoctoral research. She also worked at the Institute for Defense Analyses in Princeton in the early 1960s.

She came to Rutgers University in 1964, at a time when Rutgers had a much higher number of female faculty than many mathematics departments then or later. Among her graduate students at Rutgers was Edward R. Dougherty, later a distinguished professor of electrical engineering at Texas A&M University. She chaired the Rutgers mathematics department from 1974 to 1977. Elliott retired from Rutgers in 1991, in a year in which the university was cutting costs by offering early retirement to its employees.

Elliott died in Titusville, New Jersey on March 5, 2023, at the age of 97.
