= Affine-regular polygon =

In geometry, an affine-regular polygon or affinely regular polygon is a polygon that is related to a regular polygon by an affine transformation. Affine transformations include translations, uniform and non-uniform scaling, reflections, rotations, shears, and other similarities and some, but not all linear maps.

== Examples ==
All triangles are affine-regular. In other words, all triangles can be generated by applying affine transformations to an equilateral triangle. A quadrilateral is affine-regular if and only if it is a parallelogram, which includes rectangles and rhombuses as well as squares. In fact, affine-regular polygons may be considered a natural generalization of parallelograms.

== Properties ==
Many properties of regular polygons are invariant under affine transformations, and affine-regular polygons share the same properties. For instance, an affine-regular quadrilateral can be equidissected into $m$ equal-area triangles if and only if $m$ is even, by affine invariance of equidissection and Monsky's theorem on equidissections of squares. More generally an $n$-gon with $n > 4$ may be equidissected into $m$ equal-area triangles if and only if $m$ is a multiple of $n$.
