= A Primer of Real Functions =

Book by Ralph P. Boas Jr.

- Author: R. P. Boas, Jr, Harold P. Boas
- Language: English
- Series: Mathematical Association of America Textbooks
- Subject: Mathematics
- Publisher: American Mathematical Society
- Publication date: 1960 (1st ed.); 1996 (4th ed.)
- Publication place: United States
- Pages: 319
- ISBN: 9780883850442

A Primer of Real Functions is a revised edition of a classic Carus Monograph on the theory of functions of a real variable. It is authored by Ralph P. Boas Jr. and the fourth edition updated by his son Harold P. Boas.
