= Algebraic Geometry (book) =

Influential textbook about algebraic geometry, written by Robin Hartshorne

- First edition
- Author: Robin Hartshorne
- Language: English
- Series: Graduate Texts in Mathematics; Vol 52
- Subject: Algebraic geometry
- Genre: Textbook
- Published: 1977
- Pages: XVI + 496
- ISBN: 978-0-387-90244-9
- Dewey Decimal: 516.35

Algebraic Geometry is an algebraic geometry textbook written by Robin Hartshorne and published by Springer-Verlag in 1977.

== Importance ==
Although shorter synopses introducing scheme theory like Macdonald's Algebraic Geometry: Introduction to Schemes (1968) and Mumford's widely circulated but unpublished Red Book (1967) were available earlier, Hartshorne's Algebraic Geometry was the first comprehensive treatment of scheme theory written as a text intended to be accessible to graduate students and is considered to be the standard reference. Even so, it is considered to be notoriously difficult for beginners; reading it and working through the challenging exercises have been considered by some to be a rite-of-passage for serious students and future researchers of algebraic geometry. This book was cited when Hartshorne was awarded the Leroy P. Steele Prize for mathematical exposition in 1979.

== Contents ==
The first chapter, titled "Varieties", gives a brief, formal introduction to the classical algebraic geometry of varieties over algebraically closed fields. This chapter recalls many classical results from commutative algebra (e.g., Hilbert's Nullstellensatz), with the books by Atiyah–Macdonald, Matsumura, and Zariski–Samuel cited as references for proofs. The second and the third chapters, "Schemes" and "Cohomology", form the technical heart of the book. The last two chapters, "Curves" and "Surfaces", respectively explore the geometry of 1- and 2-dimensional objects, using the tools developed in the chapters 2 and 3.
