= Hartshorne ellipse =

In mathematics, a Hartshorne ellipse is an ellipse in the unit ball bounded by the 4-sphere S^{4} such that the ellipse and the circle given by intersection of its plane with S^{4} satisfy the Poncelet condition that there is a triangle with vertices on the circle and edges tangent to the ellipse. They were introduced by Hartshorne (1978), who showed that they correspond to k = 2 instantons on S^{4}.
