= Finding Ellipses =

2019 Mathematics book

- Author: Ulrich Daepp, Pamela Gorkin, Andrew Shaffer, and Karl Voss
- Publication date: 2019

Finding Ellipses: What Blaschke Products, Poncelet’s Theorem, and the Numerical Range Know about Each Other is a mathematics book on "some surprising connections among complex analysis, geometry, and linear algebra", and on the connected ways that ellipses can arise from other subjects of study in all three of these fields. It was written by Ulrich Daepp, Pamela Gorkin, Andrew Shaffer, and Karl Voss, and published in 2019 by the American Mathematical Society and Mathematical Association of America as volume 34 of the Carus Mathematical Monographs, a series of books aimed at presenting technical topics in mathematics to a wide audience.

== Topics ==
Finding Ellipses studies a connection between Blaschke products, Poncelet's closure theorem, and the numerical range of matrices.

A Blaschke product is a rational function that maps the unit disk in the complex plane to itself, and maps some given points within the disk to the origin. In the main case considered by the book, there are three distinct given points $0$, $a$, and $b$, and their Blaschke product has the formula
$$B(z)= z\cdot\frac{z-a}{1-\bar a z}\cdot\frac{z-b}{1-\bar b z}.$$

For this function, each point on the unit circle has three preimages, also on the unit circle. These triples of preimages form triangles inscribed in the unit circle, and (it turns out) they all circumscribe an ellipse with foci at $a$ and $b$. Thus, they form an infinite system of polygons inscribed in and circumscribing two conics, which is the kind of system that Poncelet's theorem describes. This theorem states that, whenever one polygon is inscribed in a conic and circumscribes another conic, it is part of an infinite family of polygons of the same type, one through each point of either conic. The family of triangles constructed from the Blaschke product is one of these infinite families of Poncelet's theorem.

The third part of the connection surveyed by the book is the numerical range of a matrix, a region within which the eigenvalues of the matrix can be found. In the case of a $2\times 2$ complex matrix, the numerical range is an ellipse, by a result commonly called the elliptical range theorem, with the eigenvalues as its foci. For a certain matrix whose coefficients are derived from the two given points, and having these points on its diagonal, this ellipse is the one circumscribed by the triangles of Poncelet's theorem. More, the numerical range of any matrix is the intersection of the numerical ranges of its unitary dilations, which in this case are $3\times 3$ unitary matrices each having one of the triangles of Poncelet's theorem as its numerical range and the three vertices of the triangle as its eigenvalues.

Finding Ellipses is arranged into three parts. The first part develops the mathematics of Blaschke products, Poncelet's closure theorem, and numerical ranges separately, before revealing the close connections between them. The second part of the book generalizes these ideas to higher-order Blaschke products, larger matrices, and Poncelet-like results for the corresponding numerical ranges, which generalize ellipses. These generalizations connect to more advanced topics in mathematics: "Lebesgue theory, Hardy spaces, functional analysis, operator theory and more". The third part consists of projects and exercises for students to develop this material beyond the exposition in the book. An online collection of web applets allow students to experiment with the constructions in the book.

== Audience and reception ==
Finding Ellipses is primarily aimed at advanced undergraduates in mathematics, although more as a jumping-off point for undergraduate research projects than as a textbook for courses. The first part of the book uses only standard undergraduate mathematics, but the second part is more demanding, and reviewer Bill Satzer writes that "even the best students might find themselves paging backward and forward in the book, feeling frustrated while trying to make connections". Despite that, Line Baribeau writes that it is "clear and engaging", and appealing in its use of modern topics. Yunus Zeytuncu is even more positive, calling it a "delight" that "realizes the dream" of bringing this combination of disciplines together into a neat package that is accessible to undergraduates.
