= Thomas W. Hawkins Jr. =

American historian of mathematics (born 1938)

Tom Hawkins
- Born: Thomas William Hawkins Jr. January 10, 1938 (age 88); Flushing, New York, U.S.
- Died: December 10, 2024 (aged 86)
- Education: University of Wisconsin-Madison
- Awards: Chauvenet Prize (1997); Albert Leon Whiteman Memorial Prize (2001)
- Scientific career
- Fields: History of mathematics
- Workplaces: Boston University
- Doctoral advisor: Robert Creighton Buck

Thomas W. Hawkins Jr. (January 10, 1938 - December 10, 2024) was an American historian of mathematics.

Hawkins defended his Ph.D. thesis on "The Origins and Early Development of Lebesgue's Theory of Integration" at the University of Wisconsin-Madison in 1968 under Robert Creighton Buck. From 1972 until his death he was based at Boston University. Hawkins was an invited speaker at the International Congress of Mathematicians in 1974 at Vancouver and in 1986 at Berkeley.

In 1997 Hawkins was awarded the Chauvenet Prize for his article "The birth of Lie's theory of groups", published in the Mathematical Intelligencer in 1994. In fall 2012 Hawkins was elected a Fellow of the American Mathematical Society.

== Selected publications ==
=== Articles ===
- 1970: "The origins of the theory of group characters", Archive for History of Exact Sciences, 7: 142–170 ISSN 0003-9519 JSTOR 41133320
- 1972: "Hypercomplex numbers, Lie groups and the creation of group representation theory", Archive for History of Exact Sciences 8: 243–287. doi:10.1007/BF00328434
- 1974: "The Theory of Matrices in the 19th Century", In: Ralph D. James (editor): Proceedings of the International Congress of Mathematicians, Vancouver, 1974. CMC, Vancouver 1975, vol. 2, ISBN 0-919558-04-6, pp. 561–570.
- 1974: "New light on Frobenius creation of the theory of group characters", Archive for History of Exact Sciences, 12: 217–243. doi:10.1007/BF00357245
- 1980: "Non-euclidean geometry and Weierstrassian mathematics. The background to Killing's work on Lie algebras", Historia Mathematica 7: 289–342. doi:10.1016/0315-0860(80)90027-0
- 1982: "Wilhelm Killing and the structure of Lie algebras", Archive for History of Exact Sciences 26: 126–192 doi:10.1007/BF00348350

=== Books ===
- Emergence of the theory of Lie groups. An Essay in the history of Mathematics 1869-1926 (Sources and studies in the history of mathematics and physical series). Springer Verlag, New York 2000, ISBN 0-387-98963-3.
- Lebesgue's Theory of Integration. Its Origin and Development. 2nd edition. AMS Chelsea Books, New York 1979, ISBN 0-8284-0282-5; reprint with corrections of original edition published by University of Wisconsin Press 1970; reprint of 2nd edition. AMS Chelsea Books. 2001. ISBN 9780821829639.
- The mathematics of Frobenius in context. A journey through 18th to 20th century mathematics. Springer, New York 2013, ISBN 978-1-4614-6332-0.
