= Robin Hartshorne =

American mathematician

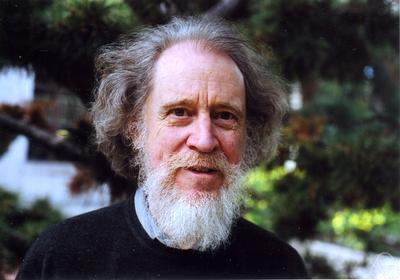
- Born: March 15, 1938 (age 88); Boston, Massachusetts, U.S.
- Education: Princeton University; Harvard University; Phillips Exeter Academy
- Known for: Algebraic Geometry; Hartshorne ellipse
- Awards: Leroy P. Steele Prize (1979); Fellow of the American Mathematical Society (2012)
- Scientific career
- Fields: Mathematics
- Workplaces: University of California, Berkeley; Harvard University
- Thesis: Connectedness of the Hilbert scheme (1963)
- Doctoral advisor: John Coleman Moore; Oscar Zariski
- Doctoral students: Mei-Chu Chang; Lawrence Ein; David Gieseker; Mark Gross; Arthur Ogus

Robin Cope Hartshorne (/ˈhɑːrtshɔːrn/ HARTS-horn; born March 15, 1938) is an American mathematician who is known for his work in algebraic geometry.

== Career ==
Hartshorne was a Putnam Fellow in Fall 1958 while he was an undergraduate at Harvard University (under the name Robert C. Hartshorne). He received a Ph.D. in mathematics from Princeton University in 1963 after completing a doctoral dissertation titled Connectedness of the Hilbert scheme under the supervision of John Coleman Moore and Oscar Zariski. He then became a Junior Fellow at Harvard University, where he taught for several years. In 1972, he was appointed to the faculty at the University of California, Berkeley, where he is a Professor Emeritus as of 2020.

Hartshorne is the author of the text Algebraic Geometry.

== Awards ==
In 1979, Hartshorne was awarded the Leroy P. Steele Prize for "his expository research article Equivalence relations on algebraic cycles and subvarieties of small codimension, Proceedings of Symposia in Pure Mathematics, volume 29, American Mathematical Society, 1975, pp. 129-164; and his book Algebraic geometry, Springer-Verlag, Berlin and New York, 1977." In 2012, Hartshorne became a fellow of the American Mathematical Society.

== Personal life ==
Hartshorne attended high school at Phillips Exeter Academy, graduating in 1955. Hartshorne is married to Edie Churchill and has two sons and an adopted daughter. He is a mountain climber and amateur flute and shakuhachi player.

== Selected publications ==
- Foundations of Projective Geometry, New York: W. A. Benjamin, 1967;
- Ample Subvarieties of Algebraic Varieties, New York: Springer-Verlag. 1970;
- Algebraic Geometry, New York: Springer-Verlag, 1977; corrected 6th printing, 1993. GTM 52, ISBN 0-387-90244-9
- Families of Curves in P^{3} and Zeuthen's Problem. Vol. 617. American Mathematical Society, 1997.
- Geometry: Euclid and Beyond, New York: Springer-Verlag, 2000; corrected 2nd printing, 2002; corrected 4th printing, 2005. ISBN 0-387-98650-2
- Local Cohomology: A Seminar Given by A. Grothendieck, Harvard University. Fall, 1961. Vol. 41. Springer, 2006. (lecture notes by R. Hartshorne)
- Deformation Theory, Springer-Verlag, GTM 257, 2010, ISBN 978-1-4419-1595-5

== See also ==
- Hartshorne ellipse
