= Doris Stockton =

American mathematician

Doris G. Skillman Stockton (1924–2018) was an American mathematician specializing in partial differential equations and Banach spaces, and known for her many mathematics textbooks. For many years she was a professor of mathematics at the University of Massachusetts Amherst.

== Education and career ==
Stockton entered the New Jersey College for Women at Rutgers in 1941. Initially planning to study dramatic arts, she was persuaded to switch to mathematics and physics so that she could more directly contribute to the World War II efforts.

She completed her Ph.D. at Brown University in 1958, with the dissertation Singular Parabolic Partial Differential Equations with Time Dependent Coefficients, supervised by Joanne Elliott.

She joined the faculty at the University of Connecticut but, soon after, moved to the University of Massachusetts. After working for 52 years on the faculty of the University of Massachusetts, Stockton retired in 2006.

== Personal life ==
Stockton was born on February 9, 1924, in New Brunswick, New Jersey. She was married to Frederick D. Stockton (1920–2015), an associate professor of civil engineering at the University of Massachusetts. She died on December 13, 2018, in Avon, Connecticut.

== Books ==
Stockton was the author of 11 textbooks and workbooks, including:

- Elements of Mathematics (2nd ed., with Helen Murray Roberts, 1956)
- Essential Mathematics (Scott & Foresman, 1972)
- Essential Algebra (1973)
- Essential Algebra with Functions (1973)
- Essential Algebra and Trigonometry (Houghton Mifflin, 1978)
- Essential Precalculus (Houghton Mifflin, 1978)
- Essential College Algebra (Houghton Mifflin, 1979)
