= David Widder =

American mathematician

- Born: 25 March 1898; Harrisburg, Pennsylvania, US
- Died: 8 July 1990 (aged 92)
- Education: Harvard University
- Known for: Bernstein–Widder theorem
- Awards: ICM Speaker (1936)
- Scientific career
- Fields: Mathematics
- Workplaces: Harvard University
- Doctoral advisor: George D. Birkhoff
- Doctoral students: Gerald G. Bilodeau; R. Creighton Buck; Ralph P. Boas, Jr. Solomon W. Golomb; Deborah Tepper Haimo; I. I. Hirschman; Donald J. Newman; Harry Pitt; Harry Pollard

David Vernon Widder (25 March 1898 – 8 July 1990) was an American mathematician. He earned his Ph.D. at Harvard University in 1924 under George Birkhoff and went on to join the faculty there.

He was a co-founder of the Duke Mathematical Journal and the author of the textbook Advanced Calculus (Prentice-Hall, 1947). He wrote also The Laplace transform (in which he gave a first solution to Landau's problem on the Dirichlet eta function), An introduction to transform theory, and The convolution transform (co-author with I. I. Hirschman).
