= Harold P. Boas =

American mathematician

- Born: June 26, 1954 (age 72); Evanston, Illinois
- Education: Harvard University (1976); Massachusetts Institute of Technology (1980)
- Awards: Stefan Bergman Prize (1995) Lester R. Ford Award (2007); Chauvenet Prize (2009); Fellow of the AMS (2013); MAA Texas Section Distinguished Teaching Award (2013); Paul R. Halmos – Lester R. Ford Award (2017) AAAS Fellow (2020)
- Scientific career
- Fields: Mathematics
- Workplaces: Columbia University; Texas A&M University
- Doctoral advisor: Norberto Kerzman
- Website: haroldpboas.gitlab.io

Harold P. Boas (born June 26, 1954) is an American mathematician, professor emeritus of Texas A&M University, where he was Professor and Presidential Professor for Teaching Excellence in the department of mathematics.

== Life ==
Boas was born in Evanston, Illinois, United States. He is the youngest of three children of two noted mathematicians, Ralph P. Boas, Jr and Mary L. Boas.

== Education ==
He received his A.B. and S.M. degrees in applied mathematics from Harvard University in 1976 and his Ph.D. in mathematics from the Massachusetts Institute of Technology in 1980 under the direction of Norberto Kerzman.

== Career ==
Boas was a J. F. Ritt Assistant Professor at Columbia University (1980–1984) before moving to Texas A&M University as an assistant professor, where he advanced to the rank of associate professor in 1987 and full professor in 1992. He was given the university title of Presidential Professor for Teaching Excellence in 2012 and the System title of Regents Professor in 2014.

He has held visiting positions at the University of North Carolina at Chapel Hill and the Mathematical Sciences Research Institute in Berkeley, California.

== Mathematical works and service ==
Boas has published over thirty papers twelve of which he coauthored with his colleague Emil J. Straube. Starting from late 80s until mid 90s, they had a spectacular progress in the study of global regularity of the Bergman projection and of the ∂-Neumann problem. In particular, they have proved the global regularity in the sense of preservation of Sobolev spaces on large class of pseudoconvex domains. Boas also provided a counterexample to the Lu Qi-Keng Conjecture which was raised by Lu Qi-Keng in 1966 and asked whether it was true for every bounded domain that the Bergman kernel function had no zeroes.

He has also published more than 200 short reviews for zbMathOpen and more than 550 reviews for Mathematical Reviews over MathSciNet.

Boas was part of Russian Translation Project of the American Mathematical Society and translated more than 84 Russian research articles in English as well as a book by Alexander M. Kytmanov from Russian into English.

He has served as the editor of the Notices of the American Mathematical Society between 2011 and 2003, took part in editorial duties in several research journals.

== Awards ==
He was the winner of the 1995 Stefan Bergman Prize of the American Mathematical Society. In 2012, he became a fellow of the American Mathematical Society.

Boas is also known for his excellence in teaching and expository works, including Reflections on the arbelos (for which he won the Chauvenet Prize in 2009). He has twice won the Lester R. Ford Award of the Mathematical Association of America in 2007 and 2017.

He has revised and updated his father's books, such as the fourth edition of A Primer of Real Functions and the second edition of Invitation to Complex Analysis.
