= Karma Dajani =

Lebanese-Dutch mathematician

- Born: Lebanon
- Education: American University of Beirut (BS); George Washington University (PhD)
- Scientific career
- Fields: Mathematics
- Workplaces: Utrecht University
- Doctoral advisor: E. Arthur Robinson Jr.

Karma Dajani is a Lebanese-Dutch mathematician whose research interests include ergodic theory, probability theory, and their applications in number theory. She is an associate professor of mathematics at Utrecht University.

== Education and career ==
Dajani was born in Lebanon, and did her undergraduate studies at the American University of Beirut, initially in medicine but switching after a year to mathematics.

Because of the Lebanese Civil War, she and her family moved to the US, where she earned her Ph.D. in 1989 from George Washington University. Again, she switched topics, beginning in functional analysis and trying graph theory but ending in ergodic theory. Her dissertation, Simultaneous Recurrence of Weighted Cocycles, was supervised by E. Arthur Robinson Jr., after a previous advisor, Daniel Ullman, shifted his own interests away from ergodic theory. As a student at George Washington University, Dajani was a two-time winner of the university's Taylor Prize in Mathematics.

After completing her doctorate, she was a postdoctoral researcher at the University of Maryland, College Park and the University of North Carolina at Chapel Hill. She took a faculty position at the University of Alabama. After marrying a Dutch mathematician, Cor Kraaikamp, she obtained a visiting position at Delft University of Technology and then joined Utrecht University. She spent 25 years as the only female mathematics professor at Utrecht.

== Book ==
With her husband Cor Kraaikamp, Dajani is the author of the book Ergodic Theory of Numbers, published in 2002 by the Mathematical Association of America as volume 29 of their Carus Mathematical Monographs. The book grew out of a course given by Dajani in a 1996 summer program for women in mathematics.
