= Paul Monsky =

American mathematician (born 1936)

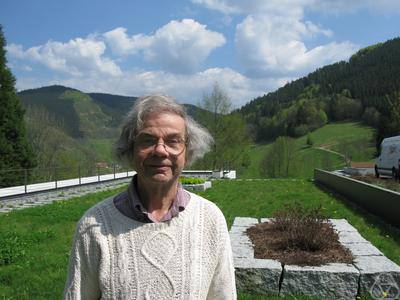
- Paul Monsky at Oberwolfach in 2009
- Born: June 17, 1936 (age 90)
- Education: Swarthmore College; University of Chicago
- Known for: Monsky–Washnitzer cohomology, Monsky's theorem
- Scientific career
- Fields: Mathematics
- Workplaces: Brandeis University
- Doctoral advisor: Walter Lewis Baily, Jr.

Paul Monsky (born June 17, 1936) is an American mathematician and professor emeritus of Mathematics at Brandeis University.

After earning a bachelor's degree from Swarthmore College, he received his Ph.D. in 1962 from the University of Chicago under the supervision of Walter Lewis Baily, Jr. He has introduced the Monsky–Washnitzer cohomology and he has worked intensively on Hilbert–Kunz functions and Hilbert–Kunz multiplicity. In 2007, Monsky and Holger Brenner gave an example showing that tight closure does not commute with localization.

The first proof of Monsky's theorem, published in 1970, which states that a square cannot be divided into an odd number of equal-area triangles, is named after him.

In the mid-1970s, Monsky stopped paying U.S. federal income tax in protest against military spending. He resisted income tax withholding by claiming extra exemptions, and this led to a criminal conviction on tax charges in 1980.
