= Isidore Isaac Hirschman Jr. =

American mathematician

Isidore Isaac Hirschman
- Born: November 22, 1922
- Died: June 10, 1990 (aged 67)
- Education: Harvard
- Scientific career
- Fields: Harmonic analysis Operator theory
- Workplaces: Washington University
- Thesis: Some Representation and Inversion Problems for the Laplace Transform (1947)
- Doctoral advisor: David Widder

Isidore Isaac Hirschman Jr. (November 22, 1922 – June 10, 1990) was an American mathematician, and professor at Washington University in St. Louis working on analysis.

== Life ==
Hirschman earned his Ph.D. in 1947 from Harvard under David Widder. After writing ten papers together, Hirschman and Widder published a book entitled The Convolution Transform. Hirschman spent most of his career (1949–1978) at Washington University, publishing mainly in harmonic analysis and operator theory. Washington University holds a lecture series given by Hirschman, with one lecture given by Richard Askey. While Askey was at Washington University, Hirschman asked him to solve an ultraspherical polynomial problem. Askey says in this lecture, "This led to a joint paper, and was what started my interest in special functions."

== Research ==
Hirschman's PhD was entitled “Some Representation and Inversion Problems for the Laplace Transform,” He mainly published papers in harmonic analysis and operator theory. In 1959 Hirschman wrote a paper with Askey, Weighted quadratic norms and ultraspherical polynomials, published in the Transactions of the American Mathematical Society. This was one of the two articles Hirschman and Askey co-wrote to complete Hirschman's 1955 research program.

In 1964 Hirschman published Extreme eigenvalues of Toeplitz forms associated with Jacobi polynomials, showing that for $n\times n$ banded Toeplitz matrices, eigenvalues accumulate on a spatial curve, in the complex plane with the normalized eigenvalue counting measure converging weakly to a measure on this curve as $n\rightarrow\infty$.

== Selected publications ==
=== Articles ===
- ——; Widder, D. V. (1949). "The inversion of a general class of convolution transforms". Transactions of the American Mathematical Society. 66: 135–201. doi:10.1090/S0002-9947-1949-0032817-4.
- ——; Widder, D. V. (1949). "A representation theory for a general class of convolution transforms". Transactions of the American Mathematical Society. 67: 69–97. doi:10.1090/S0002-9947-1949-0032818-6.
- ——; Jenkins, J. A. (1950). "Note on a result of Levine and Lifschitz". Proceedings of the American Mathematical Society. 1 (3): 390–393. doi:10.1090/S0002-9939-1950-0036346-7.
- —— (1950). "Proof of a conjecture of I. J. Schoenberg". Proceedings of the American Mathematical Society. 1: 63–65. doi:10.1090/S0002-9939-1950-0032705-7.
- ——; Jenkins, J. A. (1950). "On lacunary Dirichlet series". Proceedings of the American Mathematical Society. 1 (4): 512–517. doi:10.1090/S0002-9939-1950-0036836-7.
- —— (1950). "On the Behaviour of Fourier Transforms at Infinity and on Quasi-Analytic Classes of Functions". American Journal of Mathematics. 72 (1): 200–213. doi:10.2307/2372147. JSTOR 2372147.
- ——; Widder, D. V. (1951). "On the products of functions represented as convolution transforms". Proceedings of the American Mathematical Society. 2: 97–99. doi:10.1090/S0002-9939-1951-0041967-2.
- —— (1952). "A convexity theorem for certain groups of transformations". Journal d'Analyse Mathématique. 2 (2): 209–218. doi:10.1007/BF02825637.
- —— (1957). "Projections associated with Jacobi polynomials". Proceedings of the American Mathematical Society. 8 (2): 286–290. doi:10.1090/S0002-9939-1957-0085359-4.
- Devinatz, A.; —— (1958). "The Spectra of Multiplier Transforms on $\ell^p$". American Journal of Mathematics. 80 (4): 829–842. doi:10.2307/2372836. ISSN 0002-9327. JSTOR 2372836.
- Askey, Richard; —— (1959). "Weighted quadratic norms and ultraspherical polynomials. I". Transactions of the American Mathematical Society. 91 (2): 294–313. doi:10.1090/S0002-9947-1959-0107772-5.
- —— (1959). "Weighted quadratic norms and ultraspherical polynomials. II". Transactions of the American Mathematical Society. 91 (2): 314–329. doi:10.1090/S0002-9947-1959-0107773-7.
- —— (1959). "On multiplier transformations". Duke Mathematical Journal. 26 (2): 221–242. doi:10.1215/S0012-7094-59-02623-7.
- —— (1960). "Variation diminishing Hankel transforms". Journal d'Analyse Mathématique. 8: 307–336. doi:10.1007/BF02786854. hdl:2027/mdp.39015095257633. S2CID 120347146.
- —— (1960). "Hankel transforms and variation diminishing Kernels". Bulletin of the American Mathematical Society. 66: 40–43. doi:10.1090/S0002-9904-1960-10383-7.
- —— (1962). "Multiplier transformations. III". Proceedings of the American Mathematical Society. 13 (6): 851–857. doi:10.1090/S0002-9939-1962-0143014-8.
- Askey, Richard; —— (1963). "Mean Summability for Ultraspherical Polynomials". Mathematica Scandinavica. 12 (2): 167–177. doi:10.7146/math.scand.a-10680. JSTOR 24489384?.
- —— (1964). "Finite section Wiener-Hopf equations on a compact group with ordered dual". Bulletin of the American Mathematical Society. 70 (4): 508–511. doi:10.1090/S0002-9904-1964-11174-5.
- Baxter, Glen; —— (1964). "An explicit inversion formula for finite-section Wiener-Hopf operators". Bulletin of the American Mathematical Society. 70 (6): 820–824. doi:10.1090/S0002-9904-1964-11248-9.
- —— (1966). "Szegö functions on a locally compact Abelian group with ordered dual". Transactions of the American Mathematical Society. 121: 133–159. doi:10.1090/S0002-9947-1966-0190630-1.
- —— (1966). "Errata to Szegö functions on a locally compact Abelian group with ordered dual". Transactions of the American Mathematical Society. 123 (2): 548. doi:10.1090/S0002-9947-66-99990-9.
- ——; Liang, D. S.; Wilson, E. N. (1982). "Szegő limit theorems for Toeplitz operators on compact homogeneous spaces". Transactions of the American Mathematical Society. 270 (2): 351–376. doi:10.1090/S0002-9947-1982-0645321-6.

=== Books ===
- Hirschman, I. (1962). Infinite Series. New York: Holt, Rinehart & Winston. – A textbook for advanced undergraduate and graduate mathematics.
- Hirschman, Isidore Isaac; Widder, David Vernon (1955). The Convolution Transform. New York: Princeton University Press; now available from Dover Publications.
- Hirschman, I. I., ed. (1965). Studies in Real and Complex Analysis. Mathematical Association of America. ISBN 978-0-88385-103-6.
