= Ralph P. Boas Jr. =

American mathematician (1912–1992)

- Born: August 8, 1912; Walla Walla, Washington
- Died: July 25, 1992 (aged 79); Seattle, Washington
- Education: Harvard University
- Awards: Lester R. Ford Award (1970, 1978)
- Scientific career
- Fields: Mathematics
- Workplaces: Northwestern University; Duke University
- Doctoral advisor: David Widder
- Doctoral students: Creighton Buck; Philip J. Davis; Christopher Imoru; Dale Mugler

Ralph Philip Boas Jr. (August 8, 1912 – July 25, 1992) was a mathematician, teacher, and journal editor. He wrote over 200 papers, mainly in the fields of real and complex analysis.

== Biography ==
He was born in Walla Walla, Washington, the son of an English professor at Whitman College, but moved frequently as a child; his younger sister, Marie Boas Hall, later to become a historian of science, was born in Springfield, Massachusetts, where his father had become a high school teacher. He was home-schooled until the age of eight, began his formal schooling in the sixth grade, and graduated from high school while still only 15. After a gap year auditing classes at Mount Holyoke College (where his father had become a professor) he entered Harvard, intending to major in chemistry and go into medicine, but ended up studying mathematics instead. His first mathematics publication was written as an undergraduate, after he discovered an incorrect proof in another paper. He got his A.B. degree in 1933, received a Sheldon Fellowship for a year of travel, and returned to Harvard for his doctoral studies in 1934. He earned his doctorate there in 1937, under the supervision of David Widder.

After postdoctoral studies at Princeton University with Salomon Bochner, and then the University of Cambridge in England, he began a two-year instructorship at Duke University, where he met his future wife, Mary Layne, also a mathematics instructor at Duke. They were married in 1941, and when the United States entered World War II later that year, Boas moved to the Navy Pre-flight School in Chapel Hill, North Carolina. In 1942, he interviewed for a position in the Manhattan Project, at the Los Alamos National Laboratory, but ended up returning to Harvard to teach in a Navy instruction program there, while his wife taught at Tufts University.

Beginning when he was an instructor at Duke University, Boas had become a prolific reviewer for Mathematical Reviews, and at the end of the war he took a position as its full-time editor. In the academic year 1950–1951 he was a Guggenheim Fellow. In 1950 he became Professor of Mathematics at Northwestern University, without ever previously having been an assistant or associate professor; his wife became a professor of physics at nearby DePaul University, due to the anti-nepotism rules then in place at Northwestern. He stayed at Northwestern until his retirement in 1980, and was chair there from 1957 to 1972. He was president of the Mathematical Association of America from 1973 to 1974, and as president launched the Dolciani Mathematical Expositions series of books. He was also editor of the American Mathematical Monthly from 1976 to 1981. He continued mathematical work after retiring, for instance as co-editor (with George Leitmann) of the Journal of Mathematical Analysis and Applications from 1985 to 1991.

Along with his mathematical education, Boas was educated in many languages: Latin in junior high school, French and German in high school, Greek at Mount Holyoke, Sanskrit as a Harvard undergraduate, and later self-taught Russian while at Duke University.

Boas' son Harold P. Boas is also a noted mathematician.

== The hunting of big game ==
Boas, Frank Smithies, and colleagues were behind the 1938 paper A Contribution to the Mathematical Theory of Big Game Hunting published in the American Mathematical Monthly under the pseudonym H. Pétard (referring to Hamlet's "hoist by his own petard"). The paper offers short spoofs of theorems and proofs from mathematics and physics, in the form of applications to the hunting of lions in the Sahara desert. One "proof" parodies the Bolzano–Weierstrass theorem:

The Bolzano–Weierstrass Method. Bisect the desert by a line running N–S. The lion is either in the E portion or in the W portion; let us suppose him to be in the W portion. Bisect this portion by a line running E–W. The lion is either in the N portion or in the S portion; let us suppose him to be in the N portion. We continue this process indefinitely, constructing a sufficiently strong fence about the chosen portion at each step. The diameter of the chosen portions approaches zero, so that the lion is ultimately surrounded by a fence of arbitrarily small perimeter.

The paper became a classic of mathematical humor and spawned various follow-ons over the years with theories or methods from other scientific areas adapted to hunting lions.

The paper and later work is published in Lion Hunting and Other Mathematical Pursuits : A Collection of Mathematics, Verse, and Stories by the Late Ralph P. Boas Jr., edited by Gerald L. Alexanderson and Dale H. Mugler, ISBN 0-88385-323-X. Various online collections of the lion hunting methods exist too.

=== Pondiczery ===
E. S. Pondiczery was another pseudonym invented by Boas and Smithies as the fictional person behind the "H. Pétard" pseudonym, and later used again by Boas, this time for a serious paper on topology, Power problems in abstract spaces, Duke Mathematical Journal, 11 (1944), 835–837. This paper and the name became part of the Hewitt–Marczewski–Pondiczery theorem.

The name, revealed in Lion Hunting and Other Mathematical Pursuits cited above, came from Pondicherry (a place in India disputed by the Dutch, English and French) and a Slavic twist. The initials "E.S." were a plan to write a spoof on extra-sensory perception (ESP).

== Other ==
His best-known books are the lion-hunting book previously mentioned and the monograph A Primer of Real Functions. The current edition of the primer has been revised and edited by his son, mathematician Harold P. Boas.

The best-known of his 13 doctoral students is Philip J. Davis, who is also his only advisee who did not graduate from Northwestern. Boas advised Davis, who was at Harvard University, while Boas was visiting at Brown University.
