= Poncelet's closure theorem =

Theorem of 2D geometry

Illustration of Poncelet's porism for n = 3, a triangle that is inscribed in one circle and circumscribes another.

In geometry, Poncelet's closure theorem, also known as Poncelet's porism, states that whenever a polygon is inscribed in one conic section and circumscribes another one, the polygon must be part of an infinite family of polygons that are all inscribed in and circumscribe the same two conics. It is named after French engineer and mathematician Jean-Victor Poncelet, who wrote about it in 1822; however, the triangular case was discovered significantly earlier, in 1746 by William Chapple.

Poncelet's porism can be proved by an argument using an elliptic curve, whose points represent a combination of a line tangent to one conic and a crossing point of that line with the other conic.

== Statement ==
Let C and D be two plane conics. If it is possible to find, for a given n > 2, one n-sided polygon that is simultaneously inscribed in C (meaning that all of its vertices lie on C) and circumscribed around D (meaning that all of its edges are tangent to D), then it is possible to find infinitely many of them. Each point of C or D is a vertex or tangency (respectively) of one such polygon.

If the conics are circles, the polygons that are inscribed in one circle and circumscribed about the other are called bicentric polygons, so this special case of Poncelet's porism can be expressed more concisely by saying that every bicentric polygon is part of an infinite family of bicentric polygons with respect to the same two circles.

== Proof sketch ==
View C and D as curves in the complex projective plane P^{2}. For simplicity, assume that C and D meet transversely (meaning that each intersection point of the two is a simple crossing). Then by Bézout's theorem, the intersection C ∩ D of the two curves consists of four complex points. For an arbitrary point d in D, let ℓ_{d} be the tangent line to D at d. Let X be the subvariety of C × D consisting of (c,d) such that ℓ_{d} passes through c. Given c, the number of d with (c,d) ∈ X is 1 if c ∈ C ∩ D and 2 otherwise. Thus the projection X → C ≃ P^{1} presents X as a degree 2 cover ramified above 4 points, so X is an elliptic curve (once we fix a base point on X). Let $\sigma$ be the involution of X sending a general (c,d) to the other point (c,d′) with the same first coordinate. Any involution of an elliptic curve with a fixed point, when expressed in the group law, has the form x → p − x for some p, so $\sigma$ has this form. Similarly, the projection X → D is a degree 2 morphism ramified over the contact points on D of the four lines tangent to both C and D, and the corresponding involution $\tau$ has the form x → q − x for some q. Thus the composition $\tau \sigma$ is a translation on X. If a power of $\tau \sigma$ has a fixed point, that power must be the identity. Translated back into the language of C and D, this means that if one point c ∈ C (equipped with a corresponding d) gives rise to an orbit that closes up (i.e., gives an n-gon), then so does every point. The degenerate cases in which C and D are not transverse follow from a limit argument.

== See also ==
- Finding Ellipses
- Hartshorne ellipse
- Steiner's porism
- Tangent lines to circles
- Egan conjecture
