= Edward R. Dougherty =

American mathematician and electrical engineer (1945–2025)

- Born: September 10, 1945; New Jersey, U.S.A.
- Died: 1 November 2025 (aged 80); Bryan, Texas, U.S.A.
- Education: Rutgers University, (Ph.D. 1974); Fairleigh Dickinson University, (B.S. and MS, 1967, 1969)
- Known for: Nonlinear filtering and image processing Fuzzy systems Probabilistic boolean network
- Scientific career
- Fields: Mathematics, electrical engineering, bioinformatics
- Workplaces: Texas A&M University, since 1996, Rochester Institute of Technology,1988-1996, Fairleigh Dickinson University,1972-1988
- Doctoral advisor: Joanne Elliott

Edward R. Dougherty (September 10, 1945 – November 1, 2025) was an American mathematician, electrical engineer, Robert M. Kennedy '26 Chair, and Distinguished Professor of Electrical Engineering at Texas A&M University. He was also the Scientific Director of the Center for Bioinformatics and Genomic Systems Engineering. Dougherty was a specialist in nonlinear image processing, small-sample classification problems, and modeling gene regulatory networks. He was a Fellow of IEEE and SPIE.

Dougherty was the author of 16 books, whose topics range from basic probability books to advanced computational biology and genomic systems engineering. He proposed the Probabilistic Boolean Network (PBN) model for gene regulatory networks. PBNs have been extensively used for intervention and classification in genomic problems. He also introduced the notion of Bolstered Error Estimation and Coefficient of Determination for Nonlinear Signal Processing.

== Honors and awards ==
- 2012 Distinguished Professor, Texas A&M University
- 2011 Fellow, Institute of Electrical and Electronics Engineers
- 2010 Fellow, Texas Engineering Experiment Station
- 2007 Doctor Honoris Causa, Tampere University of Technology, Tampere University of Technology
- 2004 International Society of Optical Engineering (SPIE) President's Award
- 2000 Fellow, International Society of Optical Engineering (SPIE)

== Bibliography ==
- Dougherty, Edward; Bittner, Michael (2011). Epistemology of the Cell: A Systems Perspective on Biological Knowledge. IEEE.
- Shmulevich, Ilya; Dougherty, Edward (2010). Probabilistic Boolean Networks: The Modeling and Control of Gene Regulatory Networks. New York: SIAM Press.
- Shmulevich, Ilya; Dougherty, Edward (2007). Genomic Signal Processing. Princeton: Princeton University Press.
- Datta, Aniruddha; Dougherty, Edward (2007). Introduction to Genomic Signal Processing with Control. New York: CRC Press.
- Dougherty, Edward (2003). Hands-On Morphological Image Processing. Bellingham: SPIE Press.
- Dougherty, Edward (1999). Random Processes for Image and Signal Processing. Bellingham: Series on Imaging Science and Engineering, SPIE Press and IEEE Presses.
- Dougherty, Edward; Astola, Jaakko (1994). An Introduction to Nonlinear Image Processing. Bellingham: SPIE Press.
- Braga-Neto, Ulisses; Dougherty, Edward (2004). "Is cross-validation valid for small-sample microarray classification?". Bioinformatics. 20 (3): 374–380. doi:10.1093/bioinformatics/btg419. PMID 14960464. Archived from the original on 2014-10-06.
