= Sherman K. Stein =

American mathematician

Sherman Kopald Stein (born August 11, 1926) is an American mathematician and an author of mathematics textbooks. He is a professor emeritus at the University of California, Davis. His writings have won the Lester R. Ford Award and the Beckenbach Book Prize.

== Life ==
Stein was born on August 11, 1926, in Minneapolis; his father was a bookbinder. He graduated from the California Institute of Technology in 1946. He completed his doctorate at Columbia University in 1952. His dissertation, The Homology of the Two-Fold Symmetric Product, was supervised by Paul Althaus Smith.

Stein worked as a mathematics instructor at Princeton University for a year, and then joined the mathematics faculty at the University of California, Davis in 1953. He retired in 1993.

== Books ==
Stein is the author of:

- Mathematics: The Man-Made Universe: An Introduction to the Spirit of Mathematics (W. H. Freeman, 1963; 3rd ed., Dover, 1998)
- Calculus in the First Three Dimensions (McGraw-Hill, 1967)
- Calculus for the Natural and Social Sciences (McGraw-Hill, 1968)
- Calculus and Analytic Geometry (McGraw-Hill, 1968; 5th ed., 1992)
- Elementary Algebra: A Guided Inquiry (with Calvin D. Crabill, Houghton Mifflin, 1972)
- Geometry: A Guided Inquiry (with G. D. Chakerian and Calvin D. Crabill, Houghton Mifflin, 1972)
- Algebra II/Trigonometry (with Calvin D. Crabill, W. H. Freeman, 1976)
- An Introduction to Differential Equations (with Anthony Barcellos, McGraw-Hill, 1994)
- Algebra and Tiling: Homomorphisms in the Service of Geometry (with Sándor Szabó, Mathematical Association of America, 1994)
- Strength in Numbers: Discovering the Joy and Power of Mathematics in Everyday Life (Wiley, 1996)
- Archimedes: What Did He Do besides Cry Eureka? (Mathematical Association of America, 1999)
- How the Other Half Thinks: Adventures in Mathematical Reasoning (McGraw-Hill, 2001; reprinted as Adventures in Mathematical Reasoning, Dover, 2016)
- Survival Guide for Outsiders: How to Protect Yourself from Politicians, Experts and Other Insiders (BookSurge, 2010).

The book Algebra and Tiling: Homomorphisms in the Service of Geometry, written by Stein and Szabó, won the 1998 Beckenbach Book Prize of the Mathematical Association of America.

== Other contributions ==
Stein's doctoral research was in topology, but his research interests later shifted to abstract algebra and combinatorics. In combinatorics, he is known for formulating the tripod packing problem. The tripods of this problem are infinite polycubes, the unions of the lattice cubes along three axis-parallel rays, and they have also been called "Stein corners" in honor of his contributions to this problem. Stein is also known as one of the independent discoverers of Fáry's theorem, and for his contributions to equidissection, the partition of polygons into triangles of equal area.

Stein won the Lester R. Ford Award of the Mathematical Association of America in 1975 for a paper on the connections between group theory and tessellations.
