= Aequationes Mathematicae =

- Discipline: Mathematics
- Language: English
- Edited by: Zsolt Páles

Publication details
- History: 1968 to present
- Publisher: Birkhäuser Science
- Frequency: Bimonthly

Standard abbreviations
- ISO 4: Aequ. Math.
- MathSciNet: Aequationes Math.

Indexing
- ISSN: 0001-9054 (print); 1420-8903 (web)

Links
- Journal homepage; Journal at SpringerLink

Aequationes Mathematicae is a mathematical journal. It is primarily devoted to functional equations, but also publishes papers in dynamical systems, combinatorics, and geometry. As well as publishing regular journal submissions on these topics, it also regularly reports on international symposia on functional equations and produces bibliographies on the subject.

János Aczél founded the journal in 1968 at the University of Waterloo, in part because of the long publication delays of up to four years in other journals at the time of its founding. It is currently published by Springer Science+Business Media, with Zsolt Páles of the University of Debrecen as its editor in chief. János Aczél remains its honorary editor in chief.

It is frequently listed as a second-quartile mathematics journal by SCImago Journal Rank.
