= Waukomis, Oklahoma =

- Town
- Location in Garfield County and the state of Oklahoma
- Coordinates: 36°17′03″N 97°54′02″W
- Country: United States
- State: Oklahoma
- County: Garfield

Area
  - Total: 2.98 sq mi (7.73 km^{2})
  - Land: 2.97 sq mi (7.70 km^{2})
  - Water: 0.012 sq mi (0.03 km^{2})
- Elevation: 1,230 ft (370 m)

Population (2020)
  - Total: 1,349
  - Density: 453.6/sq mi (175.14/km^{2})
- Time zone: UTC-6 (Central (CST))
  - Summer (DST): UTC-5 (CDT)
- ZIP code: 73773
- Area code: 580
- FIPS code: 40-79200
- GNIS feature ID: 2413457
- Website: www.waukomisok.org

Waukomis is a town in Garfield County, Oklahoma, United States. As of the 2020 census, Waukomis had a population of 1,349.

== Geography ==
Waukomis is located south of the center of Garfield County. U.S. Route 81 forms the eastern border of the town; the highway leads north 8 miles (13 km) to Enid, the county seat, and south 11 miles (18 km) to Hennessey.

According to the United States Census Bureau, the town has a total area of 3.3 square miles (8.6 km^{2}), of which 0.01 square miles (0.03 km^{2}), or 0.37%, is water.

== Demographics ==
Historical population
Census	Pop.	Note	%±
1900	688		—
1910	533		−22.5%
1920	463		−13.1%
1930	445		−3.9%
1940	397		−10.8%
1950	537		35.3%
1960	516		−3.9%
1970	842		63.2%
1980	1,551		84.2%
1990	1,322		−14.8%
2000	1,261		−4.6%
2010	1,286		2.0%
2020	1,349		4.9%

=== 2020 census ===
As of the 2020 census, Waukomis had a population of 1,349. The median age was 37.5 years. 27.1% of residents were under the age of 18 and 16.2% of residents were 65 years of age or older. For every 100 females there were 101.9 males, and for every 100 females age 18 and over there were 100.0 males age 18 and over.

0.0% of residents lived in urban areas, while 100.0% lived in rural areas.

There were 518 households in Waukomis, of which 36.3% had children under the age of 18 living in them. Of all households, 53.3% were married-couple households, 18.0% were households with a male householder and no spouse or partner present, and 21.0% were households with a female householder and no spouse or partner present. About 23.0% of all households were made up of individuals and 11.2% had someone living alone who was 65 years of age or older.

There were 565 housing units, of which 8.3% were vacant. The homeowner vacancy rate was 1.5% and the rental vacancy rate was 5.6%.

Racial composition as of the 2020 census
Race	Number	Percent
White	1,148	85.1%
Black or African American	7	0.5%
American Indian and Alaska Native	36	2.7%
Asian	6	0.4%
Native Hawaiian and Other Pacific Islander	1	0.1%
Some other race	27	2.0%
Two or more races	124	9.2%
Hispanic or Latino (of any race)	62	4.6%

== Education ==
Waukomis is in the Waukomis Public Schools district.
