= Monsky's theorem =

One can't dissect a square into an odd number of triangles of equal area

In geometry, Monsky's theorem states that it is not possible to dissect a square into an odd number of triangles of equal area. In other words, a square does not have an odd equidissection.

The problem was posed by Fred Richman in the American Mathematical Monthly in 1967, after being solved for rational coordinates by John Thomas, and the solution was extended to all coordinates by Paul Monsky in 1970. For more on the history of the problem, see Equidissection#Monsky's_theorem.

== Proof ==
A square can be divided into an even number of triangles of equal area (left), but into an odd number of only approximately equal area triangles (right).

Monsky's proof combines combinatorial and algebraic techniques and in outline is as follows:

1. Take the square to be the unit square with vertices at (0, 0), (0, 1), (1, 0) and (1, 1). If there is a dissection into n triangles of equal area, then the area of each triangle is 1/n.
2. Colour each point in the square with one of three colours, depending on the 2-adic valuation of its coordinates.
3. Show that a straight line can contain points of only two colours.
4. Use Sperner's lemma to show that every triangulation of the square into triangles meeting edge-to-edge must contain at least one triangle whose vertices have three different colours.
5. Conclude from the straight-line property that a tricolored triangle must also exist in every dissection of the square into triangles, not necessarily meeting edge-to-edge.
6. Use Cartesian geometry to show that the 2-adic valuation of the area of a triangle whose vertices have three different colours is greater than 1. So every dissection of the square into triangles must contain at least one triangle whose area has a 2-adic valuation greater than 1.
7. If n is odd, then the 2-adic valuation of 1/n is 1, so it is impossible to dissect the square into triangles all of which have area 1/n.

== Optimal dissections ==
By Monsky's theorem, it is necessary to have triangles with different areas to dissect a square into an odd number of triangles. Lower bounds for the area differences that must occur to dissect a square into an odd numbers of triangles and the optimal dissections have been studied.

== Generalizations ==
Because affine transformations preserve equidissections, it follows more generally that parallelograms (the affine images of squares) also do not have odd equidissections. Centrally symmetric polygons, more generally, do not have odd equidissections, nor do polyominos.

The theorem can be generalized to higher dimensions: an n-dimensional hypercube can only be divided into simplices of equal volume if the number of simplices is a multiple of n!.
