= Center for Undergraduate Research in Mathematics =

- Abbreviation: CURM
- Formation: 2006
- Founder: Michael Dorff
- Founded at: Brigham Young University

The Center for Undergraduate Research in Mathematics (CURM) is an undergraduate mathematical sciences research skills development program funded by a grant from the National Science Foundation (NSF). CURM is administered by Occidental College in Los Angeles. It has been recognized by the American Mathematical Society as a Program That Makes a Difference. Its stated goals are to promote undergraduate research at colleges and universities throughout the United States.

== History ==
CURM was founded in 2006 by BYU mathematics professor Michael Dorff. From 2006-2015, 348 undergraduate mathematics students have participated in the program under the direction of 110 professors from 79 different U.S. universities and colleges.

In 2015, the American Mathematical Society (AMS) selected CURM for its “Mathematics Programs that Make a Difference” award for “significant efforts to encourage students from underrepresented groups to continue in the study of mathematics.”

=== Leadership ===
Kathryn Leonard is the current director of CURM. She succeeded Michael Dorff who was the director from its founding in 2006 until 2017.

Co-Directors are selected each year. Co-directors have included:

- Kathryn Leonard (Occidental College)
- Heidi Berger (Simpson College)
- Joyati Debnath (Winona State University)
- Tyler Jarvis (Brigham Young University)
- Nancy Neudauer (Pacific University)

The National Advisory Board consists of:

- Erika Tatiana Camacho (Arizona State University)
- Jo Ellis-Monaghan (Saint Michael's College)
- Joe Gallian (University of Minnesota, Duluth)
- Aparna Higgins (University of Dayton)
- Darren Narayan (Rochester Institute of Technology)
- Judy Walker (University of Nebraska–Lincoln).

== Selection of Participants ==
Mathematics faculty at any U.S. college or university may apply to participate in CURM, but particular attention is given to institutions with underrepresented student groups (HSI, HBCU), and to those that do not provide Ph.D. programs.

Faculty are selected based on an online application form including personal and research statements, a CV, and a letter of support from department chair or dean. Each selected faculty member identifies 2-5 of her/his students for participation based on demographic guidelines established by CURM. Special emphasis is given to females, minorities, 1st generation college students, and disabled students. The number of participating faculty and students depends on funding.

== The Program ==
Faculty members whose applications are accepted by CURM are awarded grants of $15,000-$25,000. These consist of a $3,000 stipend for each participating student, a $6,000 stipend for each professor/mentor, $250 in supply funds, and up to $650 per participant for travel. Beginning in 2016, applicants are required to apply in pairs from two different institutions with an agreement that the two research groups will collaborate during the funding period.

Student participants present their research at a regional mathematics conference. Before 2016, student participants would give a presentation at the spring Student Research Conference usually held at Brigham Young University. Faculty members also come to BYU for a 3-day workshop on mentoring skills.
