= Diefenderfer =

Diefenderfer is a surname. Notable people with the surname include:

- Caren Diefenderfer (1952–2017), American mathematician
- Ralph E. Diefenderfer (1887–1968), American politician from Pennsylvania

== See also ==
- Robert Edward Difenderfer (1849–1923), American politician from Pennsylvania
