= Judy Walker (disambiguation) =

Judy L. Walker is an American mathematician.

Judy Walker may also refer to:

- Judy Walker, acting headteacher of the Prescot School in England as of its 2009 closure
- Judy Walker, part of the winning women's team at the 1979 Canadian Junior Curling Championships
- Judy Walker, fictional character in the 1937 film Rhythm in the Clouds
- Judy Walker, fictional character in the 2011 film Bridesmaids

== See also ==
- Judith Walker (1938–2001), Australian politician
