= Judith Covington =

American mathematician

Judith Lynnette Covington is an American mathematician and mathematics educator who works as a professor of mathematics at Louisiana State University Shreveport (LSUS).

== Education and career ==
Covington earned her Ph.D. in 1993 at the University of Louisiana at Lafayette, with a dissertation in topological group theory jointly supervised by Victor P. Schneider and Bradd Clark, and in the same year joined the LSUS faculty. In the mid-1990s, she became one of the first cohort of fellows of Project NExT, a professional development program of the Mathematical Association of America, and she has continued to be associated with Project NExT as part of its leadership team since then.

Beyond her work in teacher education at LSUS, she has also contributed to local mathematics education by founding the North Louisiana Math Teachers' Circle in 2010, and she was elected as the governor of the Louisiana–Mississippi section of the Mathematical Association of America in 2016.

== Recognition ==
In 2004 Covington was named LSUS Elmer and Barbara Simon Distinguished Teaching Professor. The Louisiana–Mississippi section of the Mathematical Association of America gave her their Distinguished Teaching Award in 2012. In 2015 Covington was one of three winners of the Deborah and Franklin Haimo Awards for Distinguished College or University Teaching of Mathematics of the Mathematical Association of America.
