= Karen Rhea =

American mathematician

Karen Rhea is an American mathematics educator, a Collegiate Lecturer Emerita in the mathematics department of the University of Michigan. Before joining the University of Michigan faculty, she was on the faculty at the University of Southern Mississippi.

== Contributions ==
With Andrew M. Gleason, Deborah Hughes Hallett and others, Rhea is a co-author of several calculus textbooks produced by the Harvard Calculus Consortium. She is also a proponent of flipped classrooms for calculus instruction.

== Recognition ==
In 1998, the Louisiana–Mississippi section of the Mathematical Association of America gave Rhea its Award for Distinguished College or University Teaching of Mathematics. In 2011, Rhea won one of the Deborah and Franklin Haimo Awards for Distinguished College or University Teaching of Mathematics, the highest teaching award of the Mathematical Association of America. The award citation credited her work at Michigan, directing the annual 4500-student calculus sequence and preparing instructors for the sequence, as well as her work in national-level education in the Harvard Calculus Consortium.

In honor of Rhea's teaching, the University of Michigan's department of mathematics offers an annual award: the Karen Rhea Excellence in Teaching Award, for outstanding performance by its graduate student instructors.
