= Switkes =

Switkes is a surname. Notable people with the surname include:

- Glenn Switkes (1951–2009), American environmentalist and film-maker
- Jennifer Switkes, Canadian-American mathematician
- Willy Switkes (1929–2013), American character actor
