= M. Vali Siadat =

Iranian-American mathematician

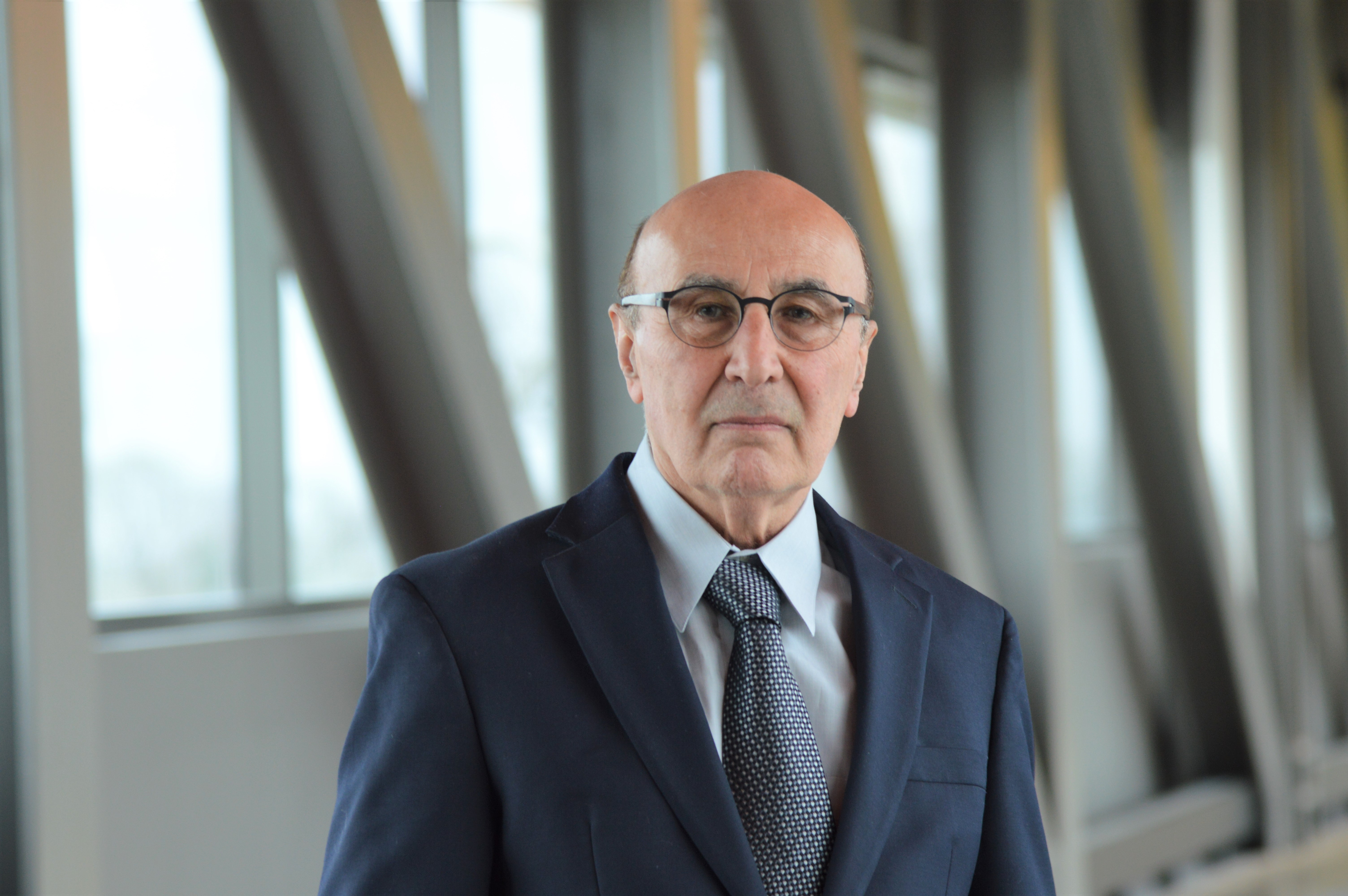
- Born: Tehran, Iran
- Education: University of California, Berkeley; San Jose State University; University of Illinois at Chicago
- Known for: Keystone Model for Teaching and Learning
- Awards: Impact on the Teaching and Learning of Mathematics American Mathematical Society (2019) Haimo Award from the Mathematical Association of America (2009) The Carnegie Foundation for the Advancement of Teaching Illinois Professor of the Year (2005)
- Scientific career
- Doctoral advisor: Yoram Sagher

M. Vali Siadat is an Iranian-American mathematician, the Distinguished Professor of Mathematics at Richard J. Daley College.

== Professional career ==
Siadat completed his Ph.D. thesis in harmonic analysis at the University of Illinois at Chicago in 1990 under the supervision of professor Yoram Sagher. He then worked on and completed a second doctorate, Doctor of Arts degree in mathematics in 1997, with a focus in mathematics education, once again with collaboration and under the supervision of professor Sagher. He is a distinguished professor of mathematics at Richard J. Daley College (City Colleges of Chicago) and an adjunct professor of mathematics at Loyola University Chicago. Siadat has taught mathematics courses for students in Science, Technology, Engineering, and Mathematics (STEM) track, as well as those in liberal arts and prospective math teachers, most of his academic life. He is the co-developer (along with Y. Sagher) of the award-winning Keystone model of teaching and learning in mathematics.

Siadat has authored or co-authored an extensive number of publications in mathematics and mathematics education journals. He was for eight years the Director/Co-Principal Investigator of nearly $800,000 grant from NASA to train pre-college students in Chicago for careers in engineering and sciences. He was also the Director/Principal Investigator of nearly $100,000 grant from Gabriella and Paul Rosenbaum Foundation to expand and disseminate the Keystone Project from Daley College to other colleges and universities in Illinois.

== Awards and honors ==
Siadat has won numerous local, state, and national awards during the many years of his long teaching career. These include “The 2019 Award for Impact on the Teaching and Learning of Mathematics” from American Mathematical Society, a 2009 Deborah and Franklin Haimo Award for Distinguished College or University Teaching of Mathematics from the Mathematical Association of America, and the 2005 Carnegie Foundation for the Advancement of Teaching and Council for Advancement and Support of Education (CASE) Illinois Professor of the Year Award. He considers educating more than 20,000 students over 50 years of his teaching profession, his crowning accomplishment.

== Selected publications ==
- An Assessment Directed, Student-Centered, and Mastery-Based Model of Teaching and Learning in Mathematics. Far East Journal of Mathematical Education, vol. 25, pp. 1–24, Dec. 2023.
- Book Publication: Notes on Harmonic Analysis: Fourier Series and Fourier Transforms, Lambert Academic Publishing, ISBN 978-620-5-63922-1, 2023.
- Book publication: Mathematics Education of our Students, Presenting an Innovative Model of Teaching and Learning in Mathematics, WTM-Verlag, ISBN 978-3-95987-231-7, 2022.
- Book Publication: Norm Inequalities for Integral Operators on Cones, Lambert Academic Publishing, ISBN 978-620-5-48840-9, 2022.
- Norm Inequalities for Integral Operators on Cones: arXiv:2206.08987v1 [math.CA], 17 June 2022.
- Notes on Harmonic Analysis. Part II: The Fourier Series. Co-authored with K. Zhou. arXiv:2206.05105v1 [math.HO], 8 June 2022.
- Omar Khayyam: Geometric Algebra and Cubic Equations. Co-authored with Alana Tholen. Math Horizons, Volume 28, 2021-Issue 1. 3 September 2020.
- Notes on Harmonic Analysis. Part I: The Fourier Transform. Co-authored with K. Zhou. arXiv:1709.03377v1 [math.CA], 28 August 2017.
- Area inside a Circle: Intuitive and Rigorous Proofs. American Journal of Computational Mathematics, vol. 7, No. 1, pp. 102–108, March 2017.
- Using Mathematics to Improve Fluid Intelligence. Notices of the AMS (American Mathematical Society), vol. 58, No. 3, pp. 432–433, March, 2011.
- 21st Century Pedagogy and Technology. Innovation Abstracts (Published by the National Institute for Staff and Organizational Development-NISOD- College of Education, University of Texas at Austin), vol. 32, No. 18, pp. 1–2, September 10, 2010.
- Combination of Formative and Summative Assessment Instruments in Elementary Algebra Classes: A Prescription for Success. Co-authored with E. Peterson. Journal of Applied Research in the Community College, vol. 16, No. 2, pp. 92–102, spring 2009.
- Keystone Method: A Learning Paradigm in Mathematics. Co-authored with P. Musial and Y. Sagher. PRIMUS (Problems, Resources, and Issues in Mathematics Undergraduate Studies), vol. XVIII, No. 4, pp. 337–348, July 2008.
- Factors that Influence Students’ Performance in Intermediate Algebra Classes at the College: A Longitudinal Research Study. Co-authored with R. Ramirez. ERIC Document Reproduction Service No. ED 557056, pp. 1–31, June 9, 2008.
- On the Applications of Axial Representation of Trigonometric Functions. AMATYC REVIEW (The Official Journal of the American Mathematical Association of Two-Year Colleges), vol. 28, No. 1, pp. 17–21, fall 2006.
- Keystone Method: A Dynamic System for Teaching and Learning. Innovation Abstracts (Published by the National Institute for Staff and Organizational Development-NISOD- College of Education, University of Texas at Austin), vol. 26, No. 18, pp. 1–2, September 10, 2004.
- Axial View of Trigonometric Functions. Mathematics Magazine (An official publication of the Mathematical Association of America), vol. 75, No. 5, pp. 396–397, December 2002.
- Computer Science with JAVA. Co-authored with D. Zhang, K. Zhou, and Y. Chyu. Produced and distributed by the Chicago Prefreshman Engineering Program (PREP). The Project was funded by the National Aeronautics and Space Administration (NASA) in collaboration with the Hispanic Association of Colleges and Universities (HACU). (2001)
- Building Study Skills in a College Mathematics Classroom. Co-authored with Y. Sagher and L. Hagedorn. The Journal of General Education, vol. 49, No. 2, pp. 132–155, 2000.
- Logic and its Application to Mathematics. Co-authored with T. Sagher. Produced and distributed by the Chicago Prefreshman Engineering Program (PREP). The Project was funded by the National Aeronautics and Space Administration (NASA) in collaboration with the Hispanic Association of Colleges and Universities (HACU). (1998)
- Success in College Mathematics: Comparisons Between Remedial and Nonremedial First-Year College Students. Co-authored with L. Hagedorn, S. Fogel, A. Nora, and E. Pascarella. Research in Higher Education, vol. 40, No. 3, pp. 261–284, June 1999.
- Factors Leading to Gains in Mathematics During the First Year in College: An Analysis by Gender and Ethnicity. Co-authored with L. Hagedorn, A. Nora and E. Pascarella. The Journal of Women and Minorities in Science and Engineering, vol. 3, No. 3, pp. 185–202, 1997.
- An Extension of Norm Inequalities for Integral Operators on Cones when 0< p <1. Co-authored with K. Zhou. Proceedings of the American Mathematical Society, vol. 119, No. 3, pp. 817–821, November 1993.
- Norm Inequalities for Integral Operators on Cones. Co-authored with Y. Sagher and K. Zhou. Colloquium Mathematicum, vol. LX/LXI, pp. 77–92, 1990.
