= Hortensia Soto =

Mexican–American mathematics educator

- Occupations: Professor, Former President of the MAA

Academic background
- Education: Chadron State College (Bachelor's, Masters) University of Arizona (Master's) University of Northern Colorado (PhD)

Academic work
- Discipline: Mathematics education
- Institutions: Colorado State University–Pueblo University of Northern Colorado Colorado State University

Hortensia Soto is a Mexican–American mathematics educator who is a professor of mathematics at Colorado State University. In May 2018, she was appointed Associate Secretary of the Mathematical Association of America (MAA). She became the president of the MAA in 2022.

== Early life and education ==
Soto was born in a sod house in Belén del Refugio, part of the municipality of Teocaltiche in Jalisco, Mexico. Her family moved to a farm near Morrill, Nebraska when she was one year old, and she grew up in Nebraska. Her talent for mathematics was encouraged in elementary school and recognized in high school; already at that age she was called on to act as a substitute mathematics teacher.

At Eastern Wyoming College, Soto started a political science degree. She earned a bachelor's degree in mathematics and a master's degree in mathematics education from Chadron State College in Nebraska in 1988 and 1989, respectively. She earned a second master's degree in mathematics at the University of Arizona in 1994, and completed a Ph.D. in educational mathematics at the University of Northern Colorado in 1996.

== Career ==
Soto worked at the University of Southern Colorado from 1989 to 1992 as director of the Mathematics Learning Center. In 1995, she became an assistant professor of mathematics at the university, earning tenure there as an associate professor in 2001; the university became known as Colorado State University–Pueblo in 2003. In 2005 she moved to the University of Northern Colorado, taking a step down to become an assistant professor again. She was promoted to associate professor in 2008 and to full professor in 2014, before moving to Colorado State University as a professor of mathematics.

At the University of Northern Colorado, Soto founded and directed a summer program for high school girls, Las Chicas de Matemáticas: UNC Math Camp for Young Women, from 2008 to 2014, and returned to rural Nebraska to participate in a teacher education program there, Math in the Middle. She is a fellow of Project NExT, and has been governor of the Rocky Mountain Section of the Mathematical Association of America. She is also a principal investigator of the Embodied Mathematical Imagination & Cognition project.

She has a long association with the MAA and has been increasingly involved with its governance. In May 2018, she took over from Gerald Venama as its Associate Secretary. In October 2021, she was elected as President-Elect of MAA and is serving a two year term, starting February 1, 2022.

== Recognition ==
In 2001, Chadron State College gave Soto its Distinguished Young Alumni Award.

In 2012, the Mathematical Association of America (MAA) gave Soto their Meritorious Service Award. She was the 2016 winner of the Burton W. Jones Distinguished Teaching Award of the Rocky Mountain Section of the MAA, and one of the 2018 winners of the Deborah and Franklin Haimo Awards for Distinguished College or University Teaching of Mathematics.

She is included in a deck of playing cards featuring notable women mathematicians published by the Association for Women in Mathematics.
