= Nicodemi =

Nicodemi is a surname. Notable people with the surname include:

- Aldo Nicodemi (1919–1963), Italian film actor
- Olympia Nicodemi (fl. 1981–2020), mathematician and mathematics educator
