= Unitary method =

Problem-solving technique

Illustration of the walking example

In elementary algebra, the unitary method is a problem-solving technique taught to students as a method for solving word problems involving proportionality and units of measurement. It consists of first finding the value or proportional amount of a single unit, from the information given in the problem, and then multiplying the result by the number of units of the same kind, given in the problem, to obtain the result.

As a simple example, to solve the problem: "A man walks 7 miles in 2 hours. How far does he walk in 7 hours?", one could first calculate how far the man walks in a single hour, as the ratio of the first two givens. 7 miles divided by 2 hours is 3 1/2 miles per hour. Then, multiplying by the third given, 7 hours, gives the answer as 24 1/2 miles.

The same method can also be used as a step in more complicated problems, such as those involving the division of a good into different proportions. When used in this way, the value of a single unit, found in the unitary method, may depend on previously calculated values rather than being a simple ratio of givens.

The precondition of proportionality is essential for this method, but is often left implicit — like in the above walking example, where it is far from being natural. For a criticism of this teaching method, see Age of the captain.

== See also ==
- Cross-multiplication
