= JGE =

JGE may refer to:

- JGE: The Journal of General Education
- Journal of Geophysics and Engineering
- Jumpgate Evolution
- Jumeirah Golf Estates
