= Word problem (mathematics education) =

Mathematical exercise presented in ordinary language

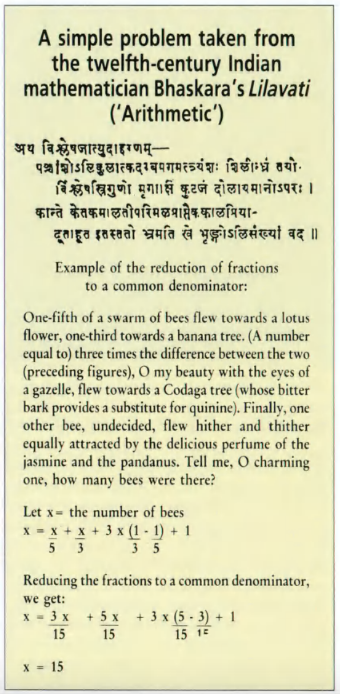
Word problem from the Līlāvatī (12th century), with its English translation and solution

In mathematics education, a word problem is a mathematical exercise (such as in a textbook, worksheet, or exam) where significant background information on the problem is presented in ordinary language rather than in mathematical notation. As most word problems involve a narrative of some sort, they are sometimes referred to as story problems and may vary in the amount of technical language used.

== Example ==
A typical word problem:

Tess paints two boards of a fence every four minutes, but Allie can paint three boards every two minutes. If there are 240 boards total, how many hours will it take them to paint the fence, working together?

== Solution process ==
Word problems such as the above can be examined through five stages:

1. Problem Comprehension
2. Situational Solution Visualization
3. Mathematical Solution Planning
4. Solving for Solution
5. Situational Solution Visualization

The linguistic properties of a word problem need to be addressed first. To begin the solution process, one must first understand what the problem is asking and what type of solution the answer will be. In the problem above, the words "minutes", "total", "hours", and "together" need to be examined.

The next step is to visualize what the solution to this problem might mean. For our stated problem, the solution might be visualized by examining if the total number of hours will be greater or smaller than if it were stated in minutes. Also, it must be determined whether or not the two girls will finish at a faster or slower rate if they are working together.

After this, one must plan a solution method using mathematical terms. One scheme to analyze the mathematical properties is to classify the numerical quantities in the problem into known quantities (values given in the text), wanted quantities (values to be found), and auxiliary quantities (values found as intermediate stages of the problem). This is found in the "Variables" and "Equations" sections above.

Next, the mathematical processes must be applied to the formulated solution process. This is done solely in the mathematical context for now.

Finally, one must again visualize the proposed solution and determine if the solution seems to make sense for the realistic context of the problem. After visualizing if it is reasonable, one can then work to further analyze and draw connections between mathematical concepts and realistic problems.

The importance of these five steps in teacher education is discussed at the end of the following section.

== Purpose and skill development ==
Word problems commonly include mathematical modelling questions, where data and information about a certain system is given and a student is required to develop a model. For example:

1. Jane had $5.00, then spent $2.00. How much does she have now?
2. In a cylindrical barrel with radius 2 m, the water is rising at a rate of 3 cm/s. What is the rate of increase of the volume of water?

As the developmental skills of students across grade levels varies, the relevance to students and application of word problems also varies. The first example is accessible to primary school students, and may be used to teach the concept of subtraction. The second example can only be solved using geometric knowledge, specifically that of the formula for the volume of a cylinder with a given radius and height, and requires an understanding of the concept of "rate".

There are numerous skills that can be developed to increase a students' understanding and fluency in solving word problems. The two major stems of these skills are cognitive skills and related academic skills. The cognitive domain consists of skills such as nonverbal reasoning and processing speed. Both of these skills work to strengthen numerous other fields of thought. Other cognitive skills include language comprehension, working memory, and attention. While these are not solely for the purpose of solving word problems, each one of them affects one's ability to solve such mathematical problems. For instance, if the one solving the math word problem has a limited understanding of the language (English, Spanish, etc.) they are more likely to not understand what the problem is even asking. In Example 1 (above), if one does not comprehend the definition of the word "spent," they will misunderstand the entire purpose of the word problem. This alludes to how the cognitive skills lead to the development of the mathematical concepts. Some of the related mathematical skills necessary for solving word problems are mathematical vocabulary and reading comprehension. This can again be connected to the example above. With an understanding of the word "spent" and the concept of subtraction, it can be deduced that this word problem is relating the two. This leads to the conclusion that word problems are beneficial at each level of development, despite the fact that these domains will vary across developmental and academic stages.

The discussion in this section and the previous one urge the examination of how these research findings can affect teacher education. One of the first ways is that when a teacher understands the solution structure of word problems, they are likely to have an increased understanding of their students' comprehension levels. Each of these research studies supported the finding that, in many cases, students do not often struggle with executing the mathematical procedures. Rather, the comprehension gap comes from not having a firm understanding of the connections between the math concepts and the semantics of the realistic problems. As a teacher examines a student's solution process, understanding each of the steps will help them understand how to best accommodate their specific learning needs. Another thing to address is the importance of teaching and promoting multiple solution processes. Procedural fluency is often times taught without an emphasis on conceptual and applicable comprehension. This leaves students with a gap between their mathematical understanding and their skill in solving mathematical problems. The ways in which teachers can best prepare for and promote this type of learning will not be discussed here.

== History and culture ==
The modern notation that enables mathematical ideas to be expressed symbolically was developed in Europe from the sixteenth century onwards. Prior to this, all mathematical problems and solutions were written out in words; the more complicated the problem, the more laborious and convoluted the verbal explanation.

Examples of word problems can be found dating back to Babylonian times. Apart from a few procedure texts for finding things like square roots, most Old Babylonian problems are couched in a language of measurement of everyday objects and activities. Students had to find lengths of canals dug, weights of stones, lengths of broken reeds, areas of fields, numbers of bricks used in a construction, and so on.

Ancient Egyptian mathematics also has examples of word problems. The Rhind Mathematical Papyrus includes a problem that can be translated as:

There are seven houses; in each house there are seven cats; each cat kills seven mice; each mouse has eaten seven grains of barley; each grain would have produced seven hekat. What is the sum of all the enumerated things?

In more modern times the sometimes confusing and arbitrary nature of word problems has been the subject of satire. Gustave Flaubert wrote this nonsensical problem, now known as the Age of the captain:

Since you are now studying geometry and trigonometry, I will give you a problem. A ship sails the ocean. It left Boston with a cargo of cotton. It grosses 200 tons. It is bound for Le Havre. The mainmast is broken, the cabin boy is on deck, there are 12 passengers aboard, the wind is blowing East-North-East, the clock points to a quarter past three in the afternoon. It is the month of May. How old is the captain?

Word problems have also been satirised in The Simpsons, when a lengthy word problem ("An express train traveling 60 miles per hour leaves Santa Fe bound for Phoenix, 520 miles away. At the same time, a local train traveling 30 miles an hour carrying 40 passengers leaves Phoenix bound for Santa Fe...") trails off with a schoolboy character instead imagining that he is on the train.

Both the British game show Winning Lines and its American adaptation involve word problems. However, the problems are worded so as to not give away obvious numerical information and thus, allow the contestants to figure out the numerical parts of the questions to come up with the answers.

== See also ==
- Cut-the-knot
- Unitary method
