= Tatiana Shubin =

Soviet and American mathematician

Tatiana Shubin is a Soviet and American mathematician known for her work developing math circles, social structures for the mathematical enrichment of secondary-school students, especially among the Navajo and other Native American people. She is a professor of mathematics at San José State University in California.

== Education and career ==
Shubin is originally from Ukraine, the daughter of a criminologist and a lawyer; she is of Jewish descent on her father's side. When she was ten, her family moved to Almaty in Kazakhstan, where her father had taken a university teaching position. After competing in the All Siberian Mathematics Competition, she was invited to a special science boarding school in Akademgorodok, but after spending the 8th grade there her parents brought her back to Almaty where she finished high school at age 16. She studied for five years at Moscow State University, earning a bachelor's degree there, but was expelled for non-participation in political activities and instead earned a master's degree at Kazakh State University in Almaty.

After obtaining a letter of invitation from an Israeli sponsor, she was allowed to leave the Soviet Union, spent nine months in Austria, and then emigrated to the US in 1978, with support from the Tolstoy Foundation. She completed a Ph.D. at the University of California, Santa Barbara in 1983, and joined the San José State University faculty as a lecturer in 1985.

== Math circles ==
Shubin founded the San José Math Circles. She co-founded the first math teachers' circle in 2006, and is a leader of the Math Teachers’ Circle Network that developed out of this circle. She was a co-founder of the Navajo Nation Math Circles project in 2012, and is a director of the Alliance of Indigenous Math Circles.

== Publications ==
Shubin is the coeditor of several books on mathematics:

- Mathematical Adventures for Students and Amateurs (edited with David F. Hayes, Mathematical Association of America, 2004)
- Expeditions in Mathematics (edited with Gerald L. Alexanderson and David F. Hayes, Mathematical Association of America, 2011)
- Inspiring Mathematics: Lessons from the Navajo Nation Math Circles (edited with Dave Auckly, Bob Klein, and Amanda Serenevy, MSRI Mathematical Circles Library 24, Mathematical Sciences Research Institute and American Mathematical Society, 2019)

Her work developing math circles among the Navajo was featured in the documentary film Navajo Math Circles (2016), broadcast on the Public Broadcasting System.

== Recognition ==
Shubin was the 2006 winner of the Award for Distinguished College or University Teaching of Mathematics of the Golden Section (Northern California, Nevada, and Hawaii) of the Mathematical Association of America. She was the 2017 winner of the Mary P. Dolciani Award of the Mathematical Association of America.

She has been named a Sequoyah Fellow by the American Indian Science and Engineering Society. The Navajo Todích’íí’nii (Bitter Water) clan have adopted her as a member.
