= Deborah and Franklin Haimo Awards for Distinguished College or University Teaching of Mathematics =

American mathematics teaching awards

Deborah and Franklin Tepper Haimo Awards for Distinguished College or University Teaching of Mathematics
- Description: The highest teaching honor recognizing extraordinarily successful college or university mathematics teachers
- Country: United States
- Presented by: Mathematical Association of America (MAA)
- Website: https://www.maa.org/programs-and-communities/member-communities/maa-awards/teaching-awards/haimo-award-distinguished-teaching

The Deborah and Franklin Tepper Haimo Awards for Distinguished College or University Teaching of Mathematics are awards given by the Mathematical Association of America to recognize college or university teachers "who have been widely recognized as extraordinarily successful and whose teaching effectiveness has been shown to have had influence beyond their own institutions." The Haimo awards are the highest teaching honor bestowed by the MAA. The awards were established in 1993 by Deborah Tepper Haimo and named after Haimo and her husband Franklin Haimo. After the first year of the award (when seven awards were given) up to three awards are given every year.

== Winners ==
The winners of the award have been:

- 1993: Joseph Gallian, Robert V. Hogg, Anne Hudson, Frank Morgan, V. Frederick Rickey, Doris Schattschneider, and Philip D. Straffin Jr.
- 1994: Paul Halmos, Justin Jesse Price, and Alan Tucker
- 1995: Robert L. Devaney, Lisa Mantini, and David S. Moore
- 1996: Thomas Banchoff, Edward M. Landesman, and Herbert Wilf
- 1997: Carl C. Cowen, Carl Pomerance, and T. Christine Stevens
- 1998: Colin Adams, Rhonda Hatcher, and Rhonda Hughes
- 1999: Joel Brawley, Robert W. Case, and Joan Hutchinson
- 2000: Arthur T. Benjamin, Donald S. Passman, and Gary W. Towsley
- 2001: Edward Burger, Evelyn Silvia, and Leonard F. Klosinki
- 2002: Dennis DeTurck, Paul Sally, and Edward Spitznagel Jr.
- 2003: Judith Grabiner, Ranjan Roy, and Paul Zeitz
- 2004: Thomas A. Garrity, Andy Liu, and Olympia Nicodemi
- 2005: Gerald L. Alexanderson, Aparna Higgins, and Deborah Hughes Hallett
- 2006: Jacqueline Dewar, Keith Stroyan, and Judy L. Walker
- 2007: Jennifer Quinn, Michael Starbird, and Gilbert Strang
- 2008: Annalisa Crannell, Kenneth I. Gross, and James A. Morrow
- 2009: Michael Bardzell, David Pengelley, and Vali Siadat
- 2010: Curtis Bennett, Michael Dorff, and Allan J. Rossman
- 2011: Erica Flapan, Karen Rhea, and Zvezdelina Stankova
- 2012: Matthew DeLong, Susan Loepp, and Cynthia Wyels
- 2013: Matthias Beck, Margaret M. Robinson, and Francis Su
- 2014: Carl Lee, Gavin LaRose, and Andrew Bennett
- 2015: Judith Covington, Brian Hopkins, and Shahriar Shahriari
- 2016: Satyan Devadoss, Tyler Jarvis, and Glen Van Brummelen
- 2017: Janet Barnett, Caren Diefenderfer, and Tevian Dray
- 2018: Gary Gordon, Hortensia Soto, and Ron Taylor
- 2019: Suzanne Dorée, Carl Lee, and Jennifer Switkes
- 2020: Federico Ardila, Mark Tomforde, and Suzanne Weekes
- 2021: Dave Kung, David Austin, and Elaine Kasimatis
- 2022: Pamela E. Harris, Darren Narayan, and Robin Wilson
- 2023: Carol S. Schumacher, Sarah C. Koch, and Adriana Salerno
- 2024: Candice Renee Price, Jan Rychtář, and Malena Español
- 2025: Monique Chyba, Angie Hodge-Zickerman, and Yvonne Lai
- 2026: Karl-Dieter Crisman, James Sellers, and Matthew Morena

== See also ==
- List of mathematics awards
