= Mary P. Dolciani Award =

American mathematics education award

- Founded: 2012
- Founders: Mathematical Association of America
- Website: https://maa.org/the-mary-p-dolciani-award/

The Mary P. Dolciani Award is an award established in 2012 by the Mathematical Association of America. The award recognizes a pure or applied mathematician with a record of distinguished contributions to K-16 mathematics education in the United States or Canada and comes with a $5,000 award. Examples of significant contributions include, but are not limited to, the development of K-16 mathematics curriculum, educational technology, or programs to improve teaching or teacher preparation. The prize is funded by a grant established by mathematician, educator, and author Mary P. Dolciani, who dedicated her career to improving mathematics education and is the author of several secondary- and college-level mathematics textbooks.

It should be distinguished from the Mary P. Dolciani Prize for Excellence in Research, awarded beginning in 2019 by the American Mathematical Society.

== Award recipients ==
- 2024: Darryl Yong, Harvey Mudd College
- 2023: Stan Yoshinobu, University of Toronto
- 2022: Roger Howe, Texas A&M University
- 2021: John Ewing, Math for America
- 2020: Henry O. Pollak, Columbia University
- 2019: Joseph Gallian, University of Minnesota Duluth
- 2018: Al Cuoco, Distinguished Scholar, Education Development Center
- 2017: Tatiana Shubin, San Jose State University
- 2015: Sybilla Beckmann, University of Georgia
- 2014: Alan H. Schoenfeld, University of California at Berkeley
- 2013: Hyman Bass, University of Michigan
- 2012: William G. McCallum, University of Arizona
