= Alan H. Schoenfeld =

American mathematician and researcher

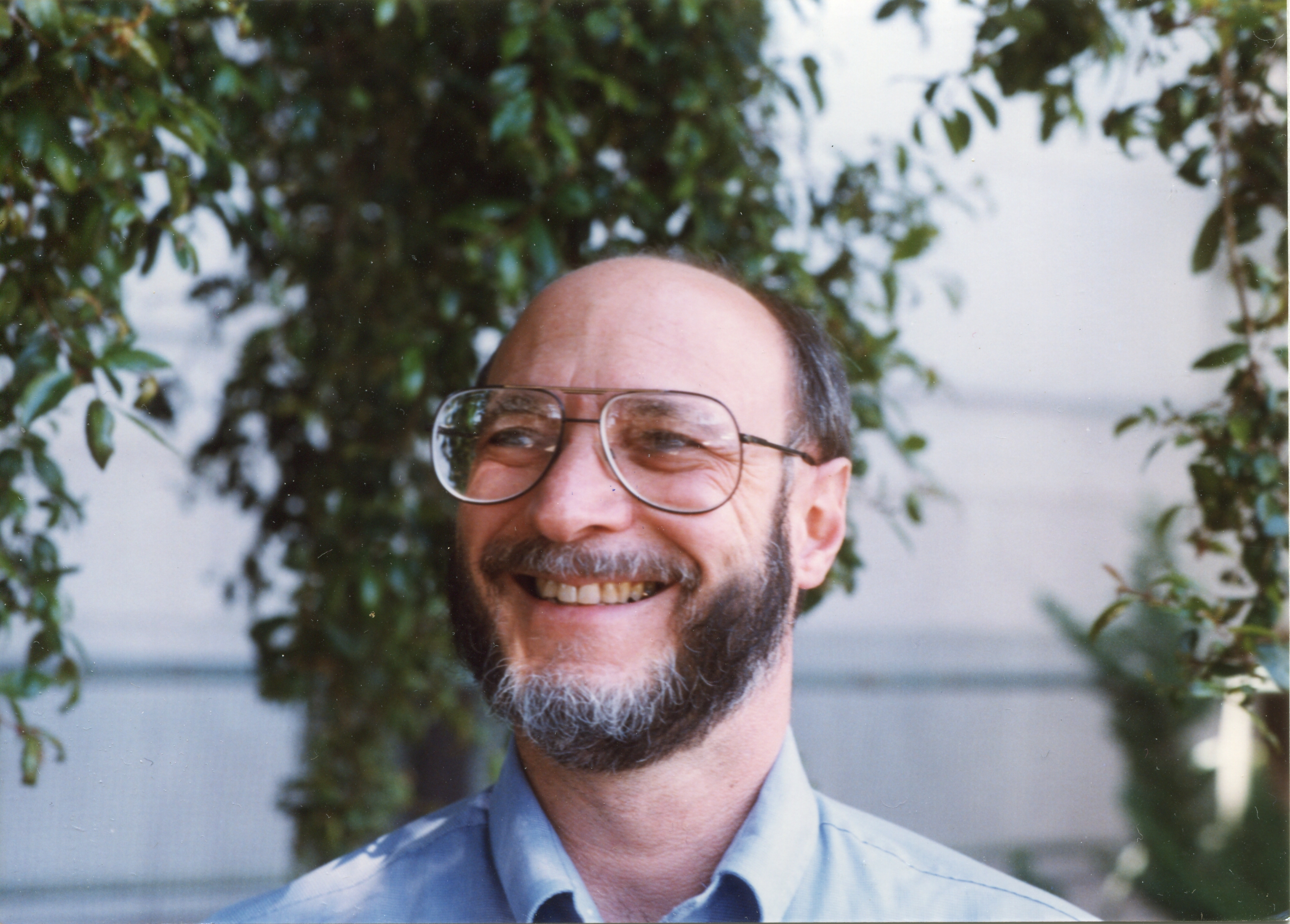
Alan Schoenfeld at Berkeley, California in 1998

Alan Henry Schoenfeld (born July 9, 1947) is an American mathematics education researcher, consultant, and theorist. He was the Elizabeth and Edward Conner Professor of Education and Affiliated Professor of Mathematics at the University of California, Berkeley before retiring in 2023.

== Education and career ==
Schoenfeld was raised in New York City and obtain a B.A. in mathematics at Queens College in 1968, and a M.S. (1968) and a Ph.D. (1973) in pure mathematics from Stanford University, working on topology and measure theory. During his graduate studies he became increasingly interested in the teaching and learning of mathematics, particularly of problem solving beyond routine exercises.

He taught at the University of California, Davis (1973–1975), the University of California, Berkeley (1975–1978), Hamilton College (1978–81), and the University of Rochester (1981–1985) before moving back to the University of California, Berkeley where he was a Distinguished Professor in the School of Education with an affiliated appointment in the Mathematics Department, retiring in 2023.

== Research ==
Schoenfeld's work ranges widely across thinking, teaching, and learning in mathematics and beyond, with particular interest in methodological issues aimed at improving the effectiveness of educational research. He has written, edited, or co-edited twenty-two books and more than two hundred articles on thinking and learning. He has focused successively on three major areas:

On problem solving. He made an empirical study of how far mathematics undergraduates tackling non-routine problems can use the strategies set out in George Pólya's work How to Solve It. The strategies were based on Pólya's reflections on how he solved problems. Schoenfeld's study found that the strategies alone are weak, and need to be strengthened by complementary domain-specific tactics. He also showed the importance of students' monitoring their work on a problem and adjusting their tactical and technical moves accordingly. This work was published as Mathematical Problem Solving (1985).

On models of teaching. Understanding the decisions that teachers make in real time in the classroom then became a focus. From the analysis in great detail of videos of mathematics lessons, he and his collaborators developed a model of teaching emphasising three key dimensions – the teacher's knowledge, goals and the beliefs about mathematics. He later generalized the work to real time decision making by professionals, published as the book How we think (2010).

On improving classrooms. Since the 1990s Schoenfeld has become increasingly focused on the challenges of translating research insights into tools and processes that improve teaching and learning in real world classrooms. Working with the design team at the Shell Centre for Mathematical Education. In Nottingham, he has led projects to develop tools for teaching and assessment, culminating in the Mathematics Assessment Project. Complementing this he developed a theoretical framework, Teaching for Robust Understanding (TRU), a model of classrooms in which productive learning is likely to occur. This identifies five key dimensions: the Mathematics; Cognitive demand; Access; Agency, authority and identity; Formative assessment.

== Appointments ==
These include:

Honorary Professor, University of Nottingham, 1994 – present.

President of the American Educational Research Association (AERA) 1998–2000

Vice President of the National Academy of Education, 2001–2005

Lead author for grades 9–12 of the National Council of Teachers of Mathematics' Principles and Standards for School Mathematics, 2000

Senior advisor to the Educational Human Resources Directorate of the National Science Foundation, 2001–2003

Senior content advisor to the U.S. Department of Education's 'What Works Clearinghouse', 2001–2003

A lead author of the mathematics content specifications for the Smarter Balanced Assessment Consortium, 2010–2012

Founding Executive member of the International Society for Design and Development in Education.

Principal investigator of grants from the US National Science Foundation, Bill and Melinda Gates Foundation, the Spencer Foundation, the Sloan foundation, Heising–Simons Foundation and others, totalling more than $45,000,000.

== Honors and awards ==
US National Academy of Education, 1994

Fellow, American Association for the Advancement of Science, 2001

Laureate, Kappa Delta Pi, 2006

Inaugural Fellow, American Educational Research Association, 2007

Klein Medal for lifetime achievement in research, from the International Commission on Mathematical Instruction, 2011

Distinguished Contributions to Research in Education Award, AERA, 2013

AERA Division G Henry T. Trueba Award for Research Leading to the Transformation of the Social Contexts of Education to The Center for Diversity in Mathematics Education (DiME), for which Schoenfeld was a PI, 2013

Mary P. Dolciani Award, Mathematical Association of America, 2014

Walter Denham Memorial award, California Mathematics Council, 2014

Doctor of Science Honoris Causa, Queens College of the City University of New York, 2018

International Academy of Education, 2021
