= Evelyn Silvia =

American mathematician

Evelyn Marie Silvia (February 8, 1948 – January 21, 2006) was an American mathematician specializing in functional analysis and particularly in starlike functions. She was a professor at the University of California, Davis, and as well as teaching mathematics at the undergraduate and graduate levels there, was active in the improvement of secondary-school mathematics education.

== Education ==
Silvia was born in Fall River, Massachusetts. A seventh-grade mathematics teacher told her she was the best student he had ever seen, a moment that built her confidence in the subject and led her to become a mathematician.

She graduated from Southeastern Massachusetts University in 1969, with a bachelor's degree in mathematics. Continuing her graduate education at Clark University, she earned a master's degree in 1973 and completed her Ph.D. in 1973. Her doctoral dissertation, Classes Related to Alpha-Starlike Functions, was supervised by Herb Silverman.

== Career ==
Silvia joined the UC Davis faculty in 1973, and remained there until retiring and becoming a professor emeritus shortly before her death.

Beyond her work as a mathematics professor, Silvia worked as a volunteer teacher of mathematics in local elementary and secondary schools. In the 1970s, she directed a master's-level teaching program at UC Davis, and in the 1990s, she headed the Northern California Math Project, an effort to improve mathematics education throughout Northern California.

== Recognition ==
The UC Davis Academic Senate gave Silvia their Distinguished Teaching Award in 1990. In 2001, she was one of the winners of the Deborah and Franklin Haimo Award for Distinguished College or University Teaching of Mathematics, given by the Mathematical Association of America to recognize college or university teachers "who have been widely recognized as extraordinarily successful and whose teaching effectiveness has been shown to have had influence beyond their own institutions".
