= Kathryn Leonard =

American mathematician and computer scientist

- Education: PhD, Brown University, 2004; BS, University of New Mexico
- Awards: AWM Service Award; Henry L. Alder Award
- Scientific career
- Workplaces: California State University, Channel Islands; Occidental College
- Doctoral advisor: David Mumford

Kathryn Leonard is an American mathematician and computer scientist. She was President of the Association for Women in Mathematics and is now AWM Past-President. She is also director of the NSF-funded Center for Undergraduate Research in Mathematics. She is currently on the American Mathematical Society Nominating Committee.

Leonard's research focuses on geometric modeling with applications to computer vision, computer graphics, and data science. She has received multiple major grants, including a National Science Foundation CAREER Award.

Leonard and Misha Collins, together with several other collaborators, are authors of "The 2D shape structure dataset", an article on a crowd-sourced database on the structure of shapes.

== Recognition ==
Leonard received a Henry L. Alder Award from the Mathematical Association of America in 2012. She received the AWM Service Award from the Association for Women in Mathematics (AWM) in 2015. The Association for Women in Mathematics named her to their 2025 Class of AWM Fellows.
