= Lisa Mantini =

American mathematician

Lisa Ann Mantini is an American mathematician and educator. In 1995, while at Oklahoma State University, she received an MMA award for Distinguished College or University Teaching of Mathematics.

== Education ==
Mantini earned a Bachelor of Science from the University of Pittsburgh, and a Master of Arts and PhD from Harvard University. All these degrees were in mathematics.

== Teaching ==
Mantini taught at Wellesley College prior to 1985. In 1985, she began to teach at Oklahoma State University. Among other awards (see below), in 1995 she received a Deborah and Franklin Haimo Award for Distinguished College or University Teaching of Mathematics, the highest teaching honor bestowed by the Mathematical Association of America. In 1998, she gave the undergraduate lecture course, "Representations of Finite Symmetry Groups", for the Mentoring Program for Women in Mathematics at the Institute for Advanced Study in Princeton, New Jersey.

== Mathematical Association of America Governor ==
Mantini served the Oklahoma-Arkansas Section of the Mathematical Association of America as Governor from 2002 to 2005 and from 2014 to 2017. This made her the first person to serve the Oklahoma-Arkansas Section of the Mathematical Association of America as Governor for two terms.

== Notable publications ==
- An Integral Transform in L2-Cohomology for the Ladder Representations of U(p,q), J. Fun. Anal. 60, 211-242 (1985)
- An L2-Cohomology Construction of Negative Spin Mass Zero Equations for U(p,q), J. Math. Anal. Appl. 136, 419-449 (1988)
- An L2-Cohomology Construction of Unitary Highest Weight Modules for U(p,q), Trans. Amer. Math. Soc. 323, 583-602 (1991)
- Inversion of an Integral Transform and Ladder Representations of U(1, q), in Representation Theory and Harmonic Analysis, Contemp. Math. 191, AMS, Providence, 1995, pp. 117–138 (with J. Lorch)
- To Challenge with Compassion: Goals for Mathematics Education, MAA FOCUS 15, Number 5 (October 1995), pp. 10–11
- Power Series and Inversion of an Integral Transform, Pi Mu Epsilon Journal 10, 560-574 (1997) (with M. Oehrtman)
- Friedberg, Solomon. (2001). Teaching Mathematics in Colleges and Universities: Case Studies for Today's Classroom. (Contributing author). United States: American Mathematical Society
- Intertwining Ladder Representations for SU(p,q) into Dolbeault Cohomology, in Non-Commutative Harmonic Analysis, Progr. Math. 220, Birkhäuser, Boston, 2004, pp. 395–418 (with J. Lorch and J. Novak)

== Notable recognition ==
- 1994: Received the AAUW’s Founder’s Postdoctoral Fellowship
- 1994: Was declared one of the Oklahoma-Arkansas Section of the Mathematical Association of America's "Distinguished College/University Teachers of Mathematics" (one was chosen each year)
- 1995: Received a Deborah and Franklin Haimo Award for Distinguished College or University Teaching of Mathematics, the highest teaching honor bestowed by the Mathematical Association of America
- 2020: Received a Certificate of Meritorious Service from the Mathematical Association of America
