= Christine Kelley =

American mathematician

Christine Ann Kelley
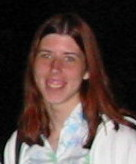
- Christine Kelley in 2002
- Scientific career
- Fields: Mathematics, Cryptography
- Thesis: Pseudocodewords, Expander Graphs and the Algebraic Construction of Low-Density Parity-Check Codes (2006)
- Doctoral advisor: Joachim Rosenthal

Christine Ann Kelley is an American mathematician, a professor of mathematics at the University of Nebraska–Lincoln, and the director of Project NExT, an initiative of the Mathematical Association of America to support the development of professionals with recent doctorates in mathematical fields. Her research involves coding theory, including low-density parity-check codes and Tanner graphs.

== Education and career ==
After "a rough start" in a required calculus course as an undergraduate at the University of Puget Sound, Kelley became a mathematics major at the encouragement of faculty member Rob Beezer, and took advantages of opportunities there including study abroad in Hungary through the Budapest Semesters in Mathematics. After graduating in 1999, and spending a year as a research assistant at the Los Alamos National Laboratory, she went to the University of Cambridge in England for Part III of the Mathematical Tripos, a one-year master's-level course. She returned to the US for continued graduate study at the University of Notre Dame in Indiana, earning a master's degree in 2003 and completing her Ph.D. in 2006. Her doctoral dissertation, Pseudocodewords, Expander Graphs and the Algebraic Construction of Low-Density Parity-Check Codes, was supervised by Joachim Rosenthal.

She became a postdoctoral researcher at the Fields Institute for Research in Mathematical Sciences in Toronto, Canada, and VIGRE Arnold Ross Assistant Professor at the Ohio State University, before landing a regular-rank faculty position as assistant professor of mathematics at the University of Nebraska–Lincoln in 2007 (on leave for an initial year to complete her postdoctoral work at Ohio State). She was Harold and Esther Edgerton Assistant Professor at the University of Nebraska from 2010 to 2012, became an associate professor in 2013, and was promoted to full professor in 2021.

After participating in Project NExT in 2008, she became director of Project NExT in 2023.

== Recognition ==
In 2024, Kelley was named a Fellow of the Association for Women in Mathematics, "for initiating and continuing impactful efforts to encourage young women to pursue mathematics, including her instrumental leadership within the Nebraska Conference for Undergraduate Women in Mathematics, and for her long record of mentoring, advising, and supervising women in mathematics".
