= Janet Barnett =

American mathematician

Janet Heine Barnett
- Occupation: professor of mathematics
- Known for: Professor of mathematics at Colorado State University–Pueblo

Academic background
- Education: PhD
- Alma mater: University of Colorado Boulder
- Thesis: Random Reals, Cohen Reals and Variants of Martin's Axioms (1990)

Janet Heine Barnett is a professor of mathematics at Colorado State University–Pueblo, interested in set theory, mathematical logic, the history of mathematics, women in mathematics, and mathematics education.

== Education and career ==
Barnett is originally from Pueblo, Colorado. She did her undergraduate studies at Colorado State University, entering as an engineering student but switching to a double major in mathematics and humanities. She graduated in 1981, served in the Peace Corps teaching mathematics in Bambari in the Central African Republic from 1982 to 1984, and in doing so discovered her love for teaching mathematics.

She completed her doctorate in 1990, at the University of Colorado Boulder. Her dissertation, Random Reals, Cohen Reals and Variants of Martin's Axioms, concerned set theory; it was supervised by Richard Laver. In the same year she joined the CSU Pueblo faculty.

To facilitate the understanding of hyperbolic functions of a hyperbolic angle, she contributed "Enter, stage center: the early drama of the hyperbolic functions".

== Recognition ==
In 2015, Barnett won the Burton W. Jones Award for Distinguished College or University Teaching of the Mathematical Association of America. In 2017, she won one of the Deborah and Franklin Haimo Awards for Distinguished College or University Teaching of Mathematics, for excellence in teaching reaching beyond her own campus. The award recognized in particular her work in integrating the history of mathematics, and its original source documents, into the teaching of mathematics, and her mentorship of mathematics schoolteachers.
