= Russian School of Mathematics =

Coordinates: 42.295°N 71.200°W

- Established in Newton, Massachusetts, U.S.

Information
- Type: Private
- Established: 1997
- Principal: Inessa Rifkin, Irina Khavinson
- Nickname: RSM, Russian School, Russian Math School
- Website: www.mathschool.com

The Russian School of Mathematics (RSM) is an after-school program based in North America that provides mathematics education to children attending K–12 public and private schools. The school provides children with the opportunity to advance in mathematics beyond the traditional school curriculum. There are over 85 locations for the Russian School of Mathematics. The founder of RSM is Inessa Rifkin, and the co-founder is Irina Khavinson.

The focus of RSM is primary school mathematics. The high school level classes offer preparation for standardized tests such as the SAT, SAT II, and AP exams (specifically AP Calculus AB & BC). Each class usually involves intensive reinforcement of topics using many examples and exercises. Accompanied by classwork, all students are given homework to reinforce what they have learned.

== History ==
According to the official website, Inessa Rifkin (born in Minsk, Belarus) and Irina Khavinson (born in Chernigov, Ukraine) left the USSR in search of a better life for their children. Together, they created a math education program based on quality and depth. According to the website, they "Sparked a Movement." In 1997, the first class was held at Ms. Rifkin's kitchen table, also said to be in her living room, outside of Boston, Massachusetts.

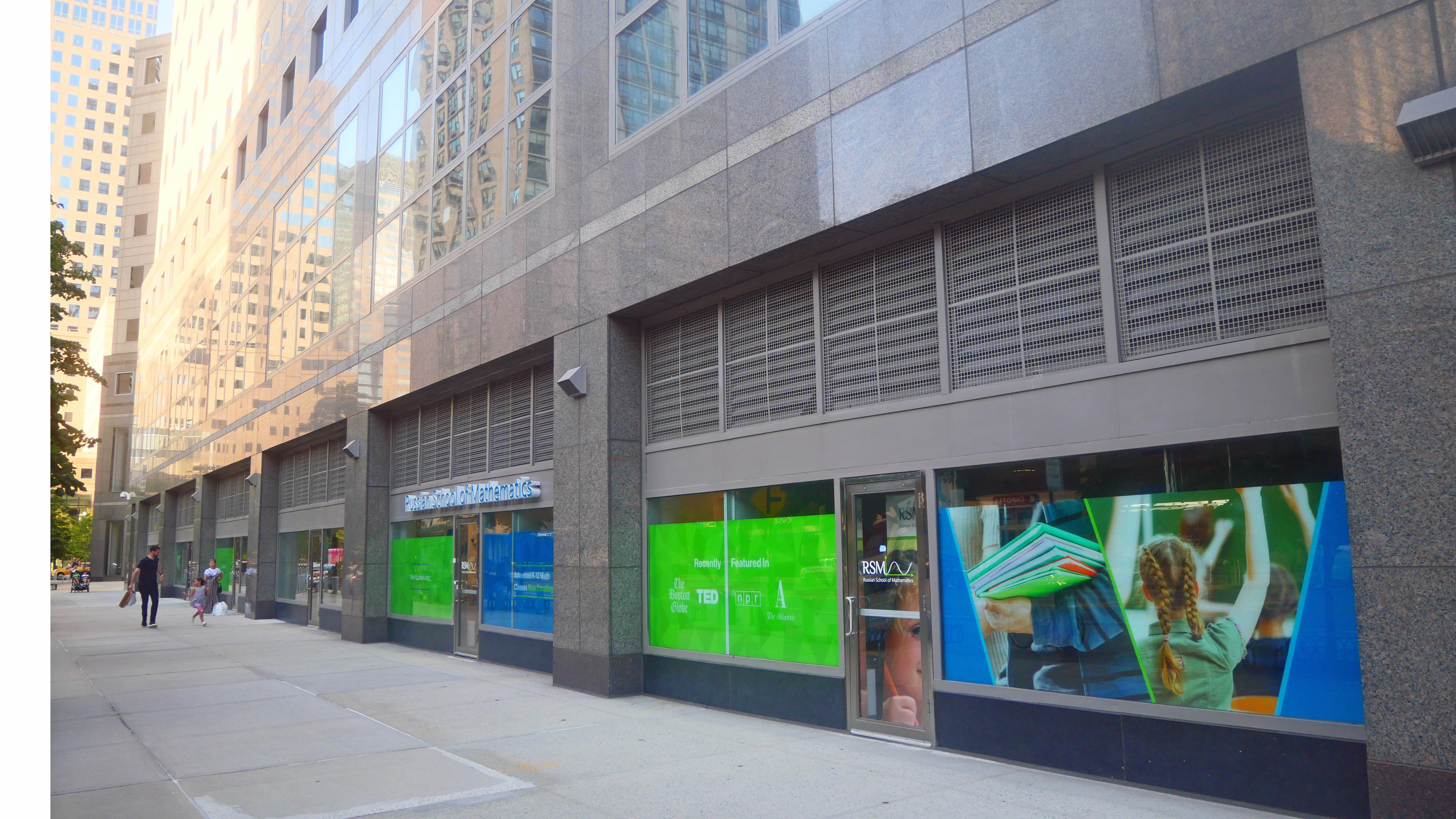
School in Lower Manhattan, New York City

== Locations ==
The after-school mathematics program was originally established in Boston, inside Inessa Rifkin's living room. Since then, the school has expanded to include more than 85 schools in the US, Canada, Israel, and the United Arab Emirates, as well as online programs. RSM also runs an overnight camp in Sunapee, New Hampshire.

== Controversy ==
On March 20, 2022 the cofounder Inessa Rifkin posted in the private RSM Summer Camp Facebook page stating:

Ukraine had a choice of surrender peacefully with min human casualties and min property loss to Putin. President Zelensky made a choice to fight back. He is risking not only his own life but by now thousands of civilians already lost their lives, among them a lot of children. On top of it almost 3,000,000 people become refugees. Theoretically one could argue that President Zelensky also, not only Putin, is responsible for human suffering. Was he right? Did he have a right to decide for other people’s children?

Rifkin has since elaborated on the statement on her Facebook page, saying that this question was intentionally written in a provocative way not to express a view point, but to spark debate within the camp, and is similar to other questions about provocative topics such as Israel and the Holocaust asked in the past.

RSM released an official statement regarding this matter in 2023.
