= Exercise (mathematics) =

Educational puzzle to be solved by symbol manipulation

A mathematical exercise is a routine application of algebra or other mathematics to a stated challenge. Mathematics teachers assign mathematical exercises to develop the skills of their students. Early exercises deal with addition, subtraction, multiplication, and division of integers. Extensive courses of exercises in school extend such arithmetic to rational numbers. Various approaches to geometry have based exercises on relations of angles, segments, and triangles. The topic of trigonometry gains many of its exercises from the trigonometric identities. In college mathematics exercises often depend on functions of a real variable or application of theorems. The standard exercises of calculus involve finding derivatives and integrals of specified functions.

Usually instructors prepare students with worked examples: the exercise is stated, then a model answer is provided. Often several worked examples are demonstrated before students are prepared to attempt exercises on their own. Some texts, such as those in Schaum's Outlines, focus on worked examples rather than theoretical treatment of a mathematical topic.

== Overview ==
According to Lev Vygotsky, appropriate exercises lie in a zone where students can complete the task with guidance

In primary school students start with single digit arithmetic exercises. Later most exercises involve at least two digits. A common exercise in elementary algebra calls for factorization of polynomials. Another exercise is completing the square in a quadratic polynomial. An artificially produced word problem is a genre of exercise intended to keep mathematics relevant. Such problems involve setting up appropriate equations, then solving them. Stephen Leacock described this type:

The student of arithmetic who has mastered the first four rules of his art and successfully striven with sums and fractions finds himself confronted by an unbroken expanse of questions known as problems. These are short stories of adventure and industry with the end omitted and, though betraying a strong family resemblance, are not without a certain element of romance.

A distinction between an exercise and a mathematical problem was made by Alan H. Schoenfeld:

Students must master the relevant subject matter, and exercises are appropriate for that. But if rote exercises are the only kinds of problems that students see in their classes, we are doing the students a grave disservice.

He advocated setting challenges:

By "real problems" ... I mean mathematical tasks that pose an honest challenge to the student and that the student needs to work at in order to obtain a solution.

A similar sentiment was expressed by Marvin Bittinger when he prepared the second edition of his textbook:

In response to comments from users, the authors have added exercises that require something of the student other than an understanding of the immediate objectives of the lesson at hand, yet are not necessarily highly challenging.

The zone of proximal development for each student, or cohort of students, sets exercises at a level of difficulty that challenges but does not frustrate them.

Some comments in the preface of a calculus textbook show the central place of exercises in the book:

The exercises comprise about one-quarter of the text – the most important part of the text in our opinion. ... Supplementary exercises at the end of each chapter expand the other exercise sets and provide cumulative exercises that require skills from earlier chapters.

This text includes "Functions and Graphs in Applications" (Ch 0.6) which is fourteen pages of preparation for word problems.

Authors of a book on finite fields chose their exercises freely:

In order to enhance the attractiveness of this book as a textbook, we have included worked-out examples at appropriate points in the text and have included lists of exercises for Chapters 1 — 9. These exercises range from routine problems to alternative proofs of key theorems, but containing also material going beyond what is covered in the text.

J. C. Maxwell explained how exercise facilitates access to the language of mathematics:

As mathematicians we perform certain mental operations on the symbols of number or quantity, and, proceeding step by step from more simple to more complex operations, we are enabled to express the same thing in many different forms. The equivalence of these different forms, though a necessary consequence of self-evident axioms, is not always, to our minds, self-evident; but the mathematician, who by long practice has acquired a familiarity with many of these forms, and has become expert in the processes which lead from one to another, can often transform a perplexing expression into another which explains its meaning in more intelligible language.

The individual instructors at various colleges use exercises as part of their mathematics courses. Investigating problem solving in universities, Schoenfeld noted:

Upper division offerings for mathematics majors, where for the most part students worked on collections of problems that had been compiled by their individual instructors. In such courses emphasis was on learning by doing, without an attempt to teach specific heuristics: the students worked lots of problems because (according to the implicit instructional model behind such courses) that’s how one gets good at mathematics.

Such exercise collections may be proprietary to the instructor and his institution. As an example of the value of exercise sets, consider the accomplishment of Toru Kumon and his Kumon method. In his program, a student does not proceed before mastery of each level of exercise. At the Russian School of Mathematics, students begin multi-step problems as early as the first grade, learning to build on previous results to progress towards the solution.

In the 1960s, collections of mathematical exercises were translated from Russian and published by W. H. Freeman and Company: The USSR Olympiad Problem Book (1962), Problems in Higher Algebra (1965), and Problems in Differential Equations (1963).

== History ==
In China, from ancient times counting rods were used to represent numbers, and arithmetic was accomplished with rod calculus and later the suanpan. The Book on Numbers and Computation and the Nine Chapters on the Mathematical Art include exercises that are exemplars of linear algebra.

In about 980 Al-Sijzi wrote his Ways of Making Easy the Derivation of Geometrical Figures, which was translated and published by Jan Hogendijk in 1996.

An Arabic language collection of exercises was given a Spanish translation as Compendio de Algebra de Abenbéder and reviewed in Nature.

Robert Recorde first published The Ground of Arts in 1543.

Firstly, it was almost all exposition with very few exercises — The later came into prominence in the eighteenth and nineteenth centuries. As a comparison we might look at another best seller, namely Walkingame’s Tutor's Assistant, first published in 1751, 70 per cent of which was devoted to exercises as opposed to about 1 per cent by Recorde. The inclusion of exercises was one of the most significant subsequent developments in arithmetical textbooks, and paralleled the development of education as teachers began to make use of textbooks as sources of exercises. Recorde was writing mainly for those who were teaching themselves, scholars who would have no one to check their answers to the exercises.

In Europe before 1900, the science of graphical perspective framed geometrical exercises. For example, in 1719 Brook Taylor wrote in New Principles of Linear Perspective

[The Reader] will find much more pleasure in observing how extensive these Principles are, by applying them to particular Cases which he himself shall devise, while he exercises himself in this Art,...

Taylor continued

...for the true and best way of learning any Art, is not to see a great many Examples done by another Person; but to possess ones self first of the Principles of it, and then to make them familiar, by exercising ones self in the Practice.

The use of writing slates in schools provided an early format for exercises. Growth of exercise programs followed introduction of written examinations and study based on pen and paper.

Felix Klein described preparation for the entrance examination of École Polytechnique as

...a course of "mathematiques especiales". This is an extraordinarily strong concentration of mathematical education – up to 16 hours a week – in which elementary analytic geometry and mechanics, and recently infinitesimal calculus also, are thoroughly studied and are made into a securely mastered tool by means of many exercises.

Sylvestre Lacroix was a gifted teacher and expositor. His book on descriptive geometry uses sections labelled "Probleme" to exercise the reader’s understanding. In 1816 he wrote Essays on Teaching in General, and on Mathematics Teaching in Particular which emphasized the need to exercise and test:

The examiner, obliged, in the short-term, to multiply his questions enough to cover the subjects that he asks, to the greater part of the material taught, cannot be less thorough, since if, to abbreviate, he puts applications aside, he will not gain anything for the pupils’ faculties this way.

Andrew Warwick has drawn attention to the historical question of exercises:

The inclusion of illustrative exercises and problems at the end of chapters in textbooks of mathematical physics is now so commonplace as to seem unexceptional, but it is important to appreciate that this pedagogical device is of relatively recent origin and was introduced in a specific historical context.

In reporting Mathematical tripos examinations instituted at Cambridge University, he notes

Such cumulative, competitive learning was also accomplished more effectively by private tutors using individual tuition, specially prepared manuscripts, and graded examples and problems, than it was by college lecturers teaching large classes at the pace of the mediocre.

Explaining the relationship of examination and exercise, he writes

...by the 1830s it was the problems on examination papers, rather than exercises in textbooks, that defined the standard to which ambitious students aspired...[Cambridge students] not only expected to find their way through the merest sketch of an example, but were taught to regard such exercises as useful preparation for tackling difficult problems in examinations.

Explaining how the reform took root, Warwick wrote:

It was widely believed in Cambridge that the best way of teaching mathematics, including the new analytical methods, was through practical examples and problems, and, by the mid-1830s, some of the first generation of young college fellows to have been taught higher analysis this way were beginning both to undertake their own research and to be appointed Tripos examiners.

Warwick reports that in Germany, Franz Ernst Neumann about the same time "developed a common system of graded exercises that introduced student to a hierarchy of essential mathematical skills and techniques, and ...began to construct his own problem sets through which his students could learn their craft." In Russia, Stephen Timoshenko reformed instruction around exercises. In 1913 he was teaching strength of materials at the Petersburg State University of Means of Communication. As he wrote in 1968,

[Practical] exercises were not given at the Institute, and on examinations the students were asked only theoretical questions from the adopted textbook. I had to put an end to this kind of teaching as soon as possible. The students clearly understood the situation, realized the need for better assimilation of the subject, and did not object to the heavy increase in their work load. The main difficulty was with the teachers – or more precisely, with the examiners, who were accustomed to basing their exams on the book. Putting practical problems on the exams complicated their job. They were persons along in years...the only hope was to bring younger people into teaching.

== See also ==
- Algorithm
- Worked-example effect
