= Joel Brawley =

American mathematician

Joel Vincent Brawley, Jr. is the Alumni Distinguished Professor of Mathematical Sciences at Clemson University. Brawley is reputed nationally for being a prolific mathematics educator and is regarded highly for his teaching abilities. Brawley is also a prominent researcher in the field of algebra, specifically finite fields.

Joel Vincent Brawley, Jr. was born in Mooresville in 1938. He went to the Mooresville High School and received his undergraduate degree in Engineering Mathematics/Mechanics, master's and doctoral degrees in Mathematics and Statistics, all from the North Carolina State University (NCSU) in Raleigh, North Carolina. Dr. Brawley came to Clemson University as an assistant professor in 1965 after a brief stint on the Faculty of NCSU. He became associate professor in 1968, professor in 1972 and the Alumni Distinguished Professor in 1982.

Dr. Brawley has also been a research consultant with the National Security Agency (NSA) for the past three decades.

Dr. Joel Brawley received the highest awards in the nation for mathematics education including the Deborah and Franklin Haimo Award for Distinguished College or University Teaching of Mathematics from the Mathematical Association of America in 1999, South Carolina Governor's Professor of the Year and the Class of 39 Award for Excellence from the Clemson University.
