= Yvonne Lai =

American mathematician

Yuan-Juang Yvonne Lai is an American mathematician, Milton E. Mohr Professor and graduate chair in the University of Nebraska–Lincoln Department of Mathematics, and an affiliated faculty member in the university's Center for Science, Mathematics and Computer Education. After doctoral research in hyperbolic geometry and geometric group theory, her research interests have shifted to mathematics education.

== Education and career ==
Lai was born in Ottawa, Canada, to parents who had emigrated there from Hong Kong; she moved to New Jersey with her family at age nine. She majored in mathematics at the Massachusetts Institute of Technology, graduating in 2002. As an undergraduate, she was a coauthor on the proof of the four-dimensional case of the double bubble theorem, on the optimal shape of two-chamber soap bubbles. She completed her Ph.D. in 2008 at the University of California, Davis, with the dissertation An Effective Compactness Theorem for Coxeter Groups supervised by Michael Kapovich.

She joined the University of Michigan from 2008 to 2011 as an NSF-RTG Assistant Professor. After continued postdoctoral research in mathematics education at the University of Michigan with Deborah Loewenberg Ball and Hyman Bass, she joined the University of Nebraska–Lincoln as an assistant professor of mathematics in 2013. She was the first tenure-track faculty member there focusing on mathematics education. She was given the Harold & Esther Edgerton Assistant Professorship in 2016, promoted to associate professor in 2019, and given the E. Mohr Associate Professorship in 2020.

Lai was the founding chair of the Special Interest Group of the Mathematical Association of America (MAA) on Mathematical Knowledge for Teaching, serving as chair from 2017 to 2019. She also chaired the MAA Committee on the Mathematical Education of Teachers from 2021 to 2024.

== Recognition ==
In 2012, Lai and her coauthors received the Janet Duffin Award of the British Society for Research into Learning Mathematics, for outstanding research published in the journal Research in Mathematics Education.

Lai was a 2025 recipient of the Deborah and Franklin Haimo Awards for Distinguished College or University Teaching of Mathematics, recognized "for her transformative work in mathematics education and teacher preparation". She is also the 2025 recipient of the American Mathematical Society Award For Impact on the Teaching and Learning of Mathematics.
