= Nancy Neudauer =

American mathematician

Nancy Ann Neudauer is an American mathematician specializing in matroid theory and known for her work in mathematical outreach in Africa and South America. She is a professor of mathematics at Pacific University, a co-director of the Center for Undergraduate Research in Mathematics, and a former governor of the Pacific Northwest Section of the Mathematical Association of America.

== Education ==
Neudauer grew up in Milwaukee. She was an undergraduate business student at the University of Wisconsin, where she graduated with a double major in actuarial science and in Wisconsin's program in risk management and insurance. After originally planning to go from there to law school, she stayed at Wisconsin for a master's degree and PhD in mathematics. Her 1998 doctoral dissertation, The Transversal Presentations and Graphs of Bicircular Matroids, was supervised by Richard A. Brualdi.

== Service ==
Neudauer has been funded by the Simons Foundation, and multiple times by the Fulbright Program, to promote mathematics in Africa and South America by traveling there to teach students graduate-level mathematics, with the goal of better preparing them for graduate study abroad. Her work in Africa has also included helping to develop support networks for women in mathematics there.

Neudauer was governor of the Pacific Northwest Section of the Mathematical Association of America from 2006 to 2009. She is a co-director of the Center for Undergraduate Research in Mathematics.

== Outreach ==
Neudauer is known for her outreach work across America and Africa, receiving multiple Fulbright awards for her work supporting the African Institute for Mathematical Sciences.

== Recognition ==
In 2010 the Pacific Northwest Section gave Neudauer their annual Award for Distinguished College or University Teaching of Mathematics. She was named as a Fellow of the Association for Women in Mathematics, in the 2027 class of fellows, "for her far-reaching mentoring from the Global South to the Pacific Northwest which has influenced generations of women mathematicians".
