= Gerald L. Alexanderson =

American mathematician (1933–2020)

Gerald Lee Alexanderson
- Born: November 13, 1933
- Died: December 16, 2020 (aged 87)
- Board member of: The Fibonacci Association; Mathematical Association of America

Academic background
- Education: University of Oregon (B.A. 1955); Stanford University (PhD 1958)
- Influences: Ivan Niven; George Pólya

Academic work
- Discipline: Mathematics
- Sub-discipline: Combinatorics; Number theory
- Institutions: Santa Clara University

Gerald Lee Alexanderson (November 13, 1933 – December 16, 2020) was an American mathematician who studied combinatorics and number theory. He was the Michael & Elizabeth Valeriote Professor of Science at Santa Clara University, and in 1997–1998 was president of the Mathematical Association of America. He was also president of The Fibonacci Association from 1980 to 1984.

== Education and career ==
Alexanderson did his undergraduate studies at the University of Oregon, graduating with a B.A. in 1955. He earned a master's degree from Stanford University in 1958, and in the same year joined the Santa Clara University faculty. At Santa Clara, he chaired the Department of Mathematics (later the Department of Mathematics and Computer Science) for 35 years, from 1967 to 2002. He also served as the Division Director of Physical Sciences and Mathematics. Abraham Hillman was his most frequent co-author. As a student, his greatest influences have been Ivan Niven and George Pólya.

He was the co-author, editor, or co-editor of 15 books. He served as the editor of Mathematics Magazine from 1986 to 1990, and was the associate editor of The American Mathematical Monthly and The College Mathematics Journal.

He actively promoted competitions in mathematics, and served as the associate director of the William Lowell Putnam Mathematical Competition.

== Awards and honors ==
In 2005, Alexanderson won both one of the Deborah and Franklin Haimo Awards for Distinguished College or University Teaching of Mathematics, and the Yueh-Gin Gung and Dr. Charles Y. Hu Award for Distinguished Service to Mathematics, both from the Mathematical Association of America.

== Selected publications ==
=== As author ===
- with Abraham Hillman: Functional trigonometry: trigonometry integrated with vectors, complex numbers, analytic geometry, and elementary functions. 1961.
- with Abraham Hillman: Algebra and trigonometry: a treatment of algebra and trigonometry integrated with vectors, complex numbers, and elementary functions. 1963. 4 editions
- with Abraham Hillman: Algebra through problem solving. 1966. 7 editions
- with Abraham Hillman: A first undergraduate course in abstract algebra. 1973. 16 editions
- with Donald J. Albers and Constance Reid: International mathematical congresses : an illustrated history, 1893-1986. New York: Springer-Verlag. 1986.; Albers, Donald J.; Alexanderson, Gerald L.; Reid, Constance (6 December 2012). 2012 pbk reprint. Springer. ISBN 9781468402995. 29 editions
- with Abraham Hillman and Richard M. Grassi: Discrete and combinatorial mathematics. 1987. 8 editions

=== As editor ===
- with Donald J. Albers: Mathematical people : profiles and interviews, with introduction by Philip J. Davis. 1985. Albers, Donald; Alexanderson, Gerald L. (18 September 2008). 2008 2nd edition. CRC Press. ISBN 9781439865170. 26 editions
- with Leonard F. Klosinski and Loren C. Larson: William Lowell Putnam Mathematical Competition : problems and solutions, 1965-1984. Washington, DC: Mathematical Association of America. 1985. Alexanderson, Gerald L.; Klosinski, Leonard F.; Larson, Loren C. (5 December 2018). 2018 pbk edition. American Mathematical Soc. ISBN 9781470449681. 25 editions
- Pólya picture album : encounters of a mathematician by George Pólya, edited by G. L. Alexanderson. Boston: Birkhäuser. 1987. 15 editions
- with Donald J. Albers and Constance Reid: More mathematical people : contemporary conversations. 1990. 13 editions
- with Dale H. Mugler: Lion hunting & other mathematical pursuits : a collection of mathematics, verse, and stories by Ralph P. Boas, Jr. Washington, D.C.: Mathematical Association of America. 1995. ISBN 9780883853238. 15 editions (See Ralph P. Boas Jr.)
- Harmony of the world : 75 years of Mathematics magazine with the assistance of Peter Ross. Washington, DC: Mathematical Association of America. 2007.
- with Donald J. Albers: Albers, Donald J.; Alexanderson, Gerald L. (2011). Fascinating mathematical people : interviews and memoirs with a foreword by Philip J. Davis. Princeton University Press. ISBN 978-1400839551. 18 editions
- with Tatiana Shubin and David Hayes: Expeditions in mathematics. Washington, D.C.: Mathematical Association of America. 2011. ISBN 9780883855713.
  - Mathematical adventures for students and amateurs, edited by David F. Hayes and Tatiana Shubin; with the assistance of Gerald L. Alexanderson and Peter Ross. Washington, DC: Mathematical Association of America. 2004. ISBN 9780883855485.
- with Donald J. Albers and William Dunham: The G.H. Hardy reader. Cambridge University Press. 2015. ISBN 9781107135550.
