= Suzanne Dorée =

Professor of mathematics

Suzanne Ingrid Dorée is a professor of mathematics at Augsburg University, where she is also chair of the Department of Mathematics, Statistics, and Computer Science,. She is chair of the Congress of the Mathematical Association of America and, as such, serves on its board of directors and the Section Visitors Program (Invited Speakers). Her doctoral research concerned group theory; she has also published in mathematics education.

== Education and career ==
Dorée grew up near New York City, and did her undergraduate studies at the University of Delaware. She joined the Augsburg university faculty in 1989, and did her graduate studies at the University of Wisconsin–Madison. She completed her Ph.D. at the University of Wisconsin–Madison in 1996; her dissertation, supervised by Martin Isaacs, was Subgroups with the Character Restriction Property and Normal Complements.

== Recognition ==
In 2004, Dorée won a Distinguished Teaching Award from the Mathematical Association of America.

In 2019, she received a Deborah and Franklin Haimo Award for Distinguished College or University Teaching of Mathematics.
