= Mathematical problem =

Problem that can be possibly solved via mathematics

A mathematical problem is a problem that can be represented, analyzed, and possibly solved, with the methods of mathematics. This can be a real-world problem, such as computing the orbits of the planets in the Solar System, or a problem of a more abstract nature, such as Hilbert's problems. It can also be a problem referring to the nature of mathematics itself, such as Russell's Paradox.

== Real-world problems ==
Informal "real-world" mathematical problems are questions related to a concrete setting, such as "Adam has five apples and gives John three. How many has he left?". Such questions are usually more difficult to solve than regular mathematical exercises like "5 − 3", even if one knows the mathematics required to solve the problem. Known as word problems, they are used in mathematics education to teach students to connect real-world situations to the abstract language of mathematics and to motivate learning mathematics by making links to real life.

In general, to use mathematics for solving a real-world problem, the first step is to construct a mathematical model of the problem. This involves abstraction from the details of the problem, and the modeller has to be careful not to lose essential aspects in translating the original problem into a mathematical one. After the problem has been solved in the world of mathematics, the solution must be translated back into the context of the original problem.

== Abstract problems ==
Abstract mathematical problems arise in all fields of mathematics. While mathematicians usually study them for their own sake, by doing so, results may be obtained that find application outside the realm of mathematics. Theoretical physics has historically been a rich source of inspiration.

Some abstract problems have been rigorously proved to be unsolvable, such as squaring the circle and trisecting the angle using only the compass and straightedge constructions of classical geometry, and solving the general quintic equation algebraically. Also provably unsolvable are so-called undecidable problems, such as the halting problem for Turing machines.

Some well-known difficult abstract problems that have been solved relatively recently are the four-colour theorem, Fermat's Last Theorem, and the Poincaré conjecture.

Computers do not need to have a sense of the motivations of mathematicians in order to do what they do. Formal definitions and computer-checkable deductions are absolutely central to mathematical science.

== Degradation of problems to exercises ==
Mathematics educators using problem solving for evaluation have an issue phrased by Alan H. Schoenfeld:

How can one compare test scores from year to year, when very different problems are used? (If similar problems are used year after year, teachers and students will learn what they are, students will practice them: problems become exercises, and the test no longer assesses problem solving).

The same issue was faced by Sylvestre Lacroix almost two centuries earlier:

... it is necessary to vary the questions that students might communicate with each other. Though they may fail the exam, they might pass later. Thus distribution of questions, the variety of topics, or the answers, risks losing the opportunity to compare, with precision, the candidates one-to-another.

Such reduction of problems into exercises is characteristic of mathematics in history. For example, describing the preparations for the Cambridge Mathematical Tripos in the 19th century, Andrew Warwick wrote:

... many families of the then standard problems had originally taxed the abilities of the greatest mathematicians of the 18th century.
While from a historical point of view this may be desirable, so that frequently-encountered problem types become automated, allowing more efficient solution, from an educational point of view, learners may not learn to problem solve if merely taught procedures for common problem types.

== See also ==
- List of unsolved problems in mathematics
- Problem solving
- Mathematical game
