= Joseph Gallian =

American mathematician

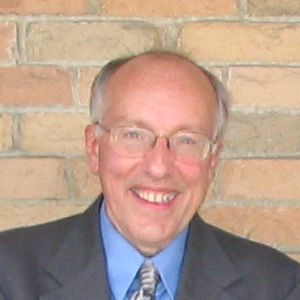
- Born: January 5, 1942 (age 84); Pennsylvania, US
- Education: Slippery Rock University; University of Kansas; University of Notre Dame
- Known for: REU program/Combinatorics
- Awards: The Elias M. Stein Mentoring Award American Mathematical Society (2026) Mary P. Dolciani Award Mathematical Association of America (2019) Haimo Award from the Mathematical Association of America (1993) The Carnegie Foundation for the Advancement of Teaching Minnesota Professor of the Year (2003) Fellow of the American Mathematical Society (2013) Mathematical Association of America Gung and Hu Award for Distinguished Service to Mathematics (2011)
- Scientific career
- Workplaces: University of Minnesota Duluth
- Doctoral advisor: Karl Kronstein

Joseph A. Gallian (born January 5, 1942) is an American mathematician who is the Professor Emeritus in the Department of Mathematics and Statistics at the University of Minnesota Duluth.

== Professional career ==
Gallian completed his Ph.D. thesis, entitled Two-Step Centralizers in Finite p-Groups, at the University of Notre Dame in 1971 under the supervision of Karl Kronstein. He has been a professor at the University of Minnesota Duluth since 1972. In addition to teaching math classes, he taught a humanities course called "The Lives and Music of the Beatles" for 33 years and a liberal arts course on math and sports.

Gallian has authored or edited six books (Contemporary Abstract Algebra, Taylor & Francis 10th edition; For All Practical Purposes, W.H. Freeman (coauthor); Principles and Practices of Mathematics, Springer-Verlag; Proceedings of the Conference on Summer Undergraduate Mathematics Research Programs, Editor, American Mathematical Society; Proceedings of the Conference on Promoting Undergraduate Research in Mathematics (editor), American Mathematical Society; Mathematics and Sports, Mathematical Association of America) and over 100 articles. He earned media attention in 1991 when he determined the methods used by Minnesota and many other states for assigning drivers' license numbers.

Between 1977 and 2025, Gallian ran forty-six Research Experience for Undergraduates (REU) programs at the University of Minnesota Duluth. The program has been funded by the University of Minnesota Duluth grants from the National Science Foundation (40+ years) and the National Security Agency (30+ years). It is one of the oldest and longest-running REUs in the country. As of the end of 2025, the program has had 292 undergraduate participants and has produced more than 330 publications in mainstream professional journals. More than 180 Duluth REU students have received a PhD degree.

Gallian served a 2-year term as the President of the Mathematical Association of America starting in January 2007. In addition, he was co-director of Project NExT from 1998 to 2012, Associate Editor of MAA OnLine since 1997, a member of the advisory board of Math Horizons from 1993 to 2013, a member of the editorial board of the Mathematics Magazine for five years and the American Mathematical Monthly for 15 years. In 2021 he became a co-editor of the MAA Mugs to Donuts e-newsletter for Putnam competition students.

== Awards and honors ==
Gallian has won both the Allendoerfer and Evans awards for exposition from the Mathematical Association of America (MAA) and was the Pólya lecturer for the MAA from 1999 to 2001.

His excellence in teaching earned him the Deborah and Franklin Haimo Award for Distinguished College or University Teaching of Mathematics from the MAA in 1993 and he was the Carnegie Foundation for the Advancement of Teaching Minnesota Professor of the Year in 2003.

In 2019 he received the MAA's Mary P. Dolciani Award for making a distinguished contribution to the mathematical education of K-16 students in the United States or Canada.

In 2011 he received the MAA's Yueh-Gin Gung and Dr. Charles Y. Hu Distinguished Service to Mathematics Award.

In 2000, Gallian was named by a Duluth newspaper as one of the "100 Great Duluthians of the 20th Century".

In 2013 he became a fellow of the American Mathematical Society.

In 2026 he received the AMS Elias M. Stein Mentoring Award.

== Selected publications ==
- Gallian, Joseph A. (2025). Contemporary Abstract Algebra, 11th edition. Boca Raton, FL: CRC Press. ISBN 978-1-032-77891-4.
- Gallian, Joseph A., ed. (2010). Mathematics and Sports. Washington, DC: Mathematical Association of America. ISBN 978-0-88385-349-8.
- Gallian, Joseph A. "A Dynamic Survey of Graph Labeling". The Electronic Journal of Combinatorics. doi:10.37236/27.
