= Nigel Boston =

British-American mathematician (1961–2024)

- Born: July 20, 1961
- Died: March 31, 2024 (aged 62)
- Education: Harvard University; University of Cambridge
- Scientific career
- Fields: Mathematics
- Workplaces: University of Wisconsin–Madison
- Thesis: Deformation Theory of Galois Representations (1987)
- Doctoral advisor: Barry Mazur
- Doctoral students: Judy L. Walker

Nigel Boston (July 20, 1961 – March 31, 2024) was a British-American mathematician, who made notable contributions to algebraic number theory, group theory, and arithmetic geometry.

== Biography ==
Boston attended Harvard University, earning his doctorate in 1987, under supervision of Barry Mazur. He was a Professor Emeritus at the University of Wisconsin–Madison. In 2012, he became a fellow of the American Mathematical Society.

Boston died on March 31, 2024, at the age of 62.
