= Adriana Salerno =

Venezuelan-American mathematician

Adriana J. Salerno Domínguez
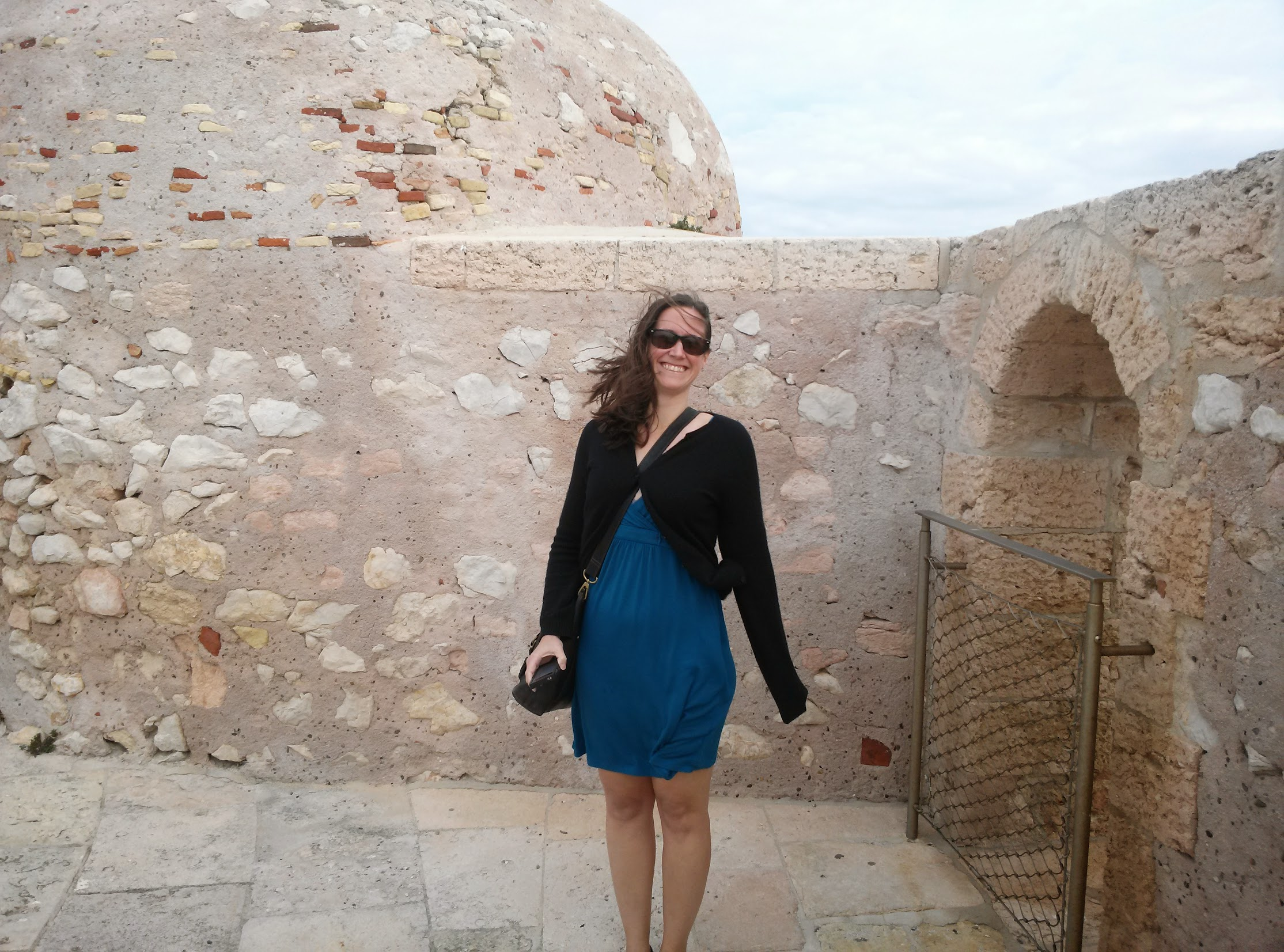
- Salerno in 2013
- Born: 1979 (age 46–47); Caracas, Venezuela
- Occupations: Professor, mathematician
- Awards: Haimo Award

Academic background
- Education: Simón Bolívar U. (2001); U. Texas at Austin (2009)
- Thesis: Hypergeometric Functions in Arithmetic Geometry (2009)
- Doctoral advisor: Fernando Rodríguez-Villegas

Academic work
- Discipline: Mathematics
- Sub-discipline: Number theory: arithmetic geometry, arithmetic dynamics
- Institutions: Bates College; National Science Foundation
- Website: https://sites.google.com/view/asalerno

Adriana Julia Salerno Domínguez (born 1979) is a Venezuelan-American mathematician who currently serves as the Director of Community Advancement at the American Mathematical Society. She was a professor of mathematics at Bates College from 2009-2025, and a program director at the National Science Foundation from 2021-2026. Her research interests include arithmetic geometry and arithmetic dynamics in number theory.

== Education and career ==
Salerno was born in Caracas in 1979, and earned a licenciatura in mathematics from Simón Bolívar University (Venezuela) in 2001, advised by Pedro Berrizbeitia. She completed a Ph.D. in mathematics in 2009 at the University of Texas at Austin, with the dissertation Hypergeometric Functions in Arithmetic Geometry supervised by Fernando Rodríguez-Villegas.

She joined Bates College as an assistant professor in 2009. In 2016, she visited the Mathematical Association of America (MAA) headquarters in Washington, DC, as Dolciani Visiting Mathematician. After serving as department chair, she took a leave from Bates College beginning in 2021 to become a program officer for the National Science Foundation, where she served as a program director for algebra and number theory. In 2021, she was also elected vice president of the MAA.. She left the National Science Foundation in May 2026 to take up the position of Director of Community Advancement at the American Mathematical Society.

She is also a mathematics blogger, the co-founder of the American Mathematical Society blogs "Ph.D. plus epsilon" and "inclusion/exclusion".

== Recognition ==
Salerno is a 2023 recipient of the Deborah and Franklin Haimo Awards for Distinguished College or University Teaching of Mathematics.
