= Angie Hodge-Zickerman =

American mathematics educator

Angie Hodge‑Zickerman
- Other names: Angie Hodge; Angela Marie Hodge
- Education: Minnesota State University Moorhead (B.A.); Purdue University (M.S., Ph.D.)
- Occupation: Mathematics educator
- Employer: Northern Arizona University
- Known for: Gender equity in mathematics education; inquiry-based learning, flipped classrooms
- Title: Chair, Department of Educational Specialties; Professor of Mathematics and Statistics

Angie Hodge-Zickerman (also published as Angie Hodge and Angela Marie Hodge) is an American mathematics educator. She chairs the Department of Educational Specialties at Northern Arizona University, where she is also a full professor in the Department of Mathematics and Statistics. Her publications in mathematics education include work on gender equity, inquiry-based learning, and flipped classrooms.

== Education and career ==
Hodge-Zickerman is originally from northern Minnesota, and has a 2002 bachelor's degree in mathematics from Minnesota State University Moorhead. She went to Purdue University for graduate study, receiving a master's degree in mathematics in 2004 and a Ph.D. in mathematics education in 2007. Her dissertation was Pre-service Secondary Mathematics Teachers: Mathematical and Pedagogical Experiences in a Teaching Algebra Seminar.

She has been a full-time mathematics educator since 2007, first at North Dakota State University as an assistant professor of mathematics and teacher education and then, in 2011, moving to the University of Nebraska Omaha as assistant professor of mathematics and Dr. George Haddix Chair of Mathematics Education. She moved to Northern Arizona University in 2020. She is the 2023–2025 chair-elect of the Southwestern Section of the Mathematical Association of America.

== Recognition ==
Hodge-Zickerman is one of three 2025 recipients of the Deborah and Franklin Haimo Awards for Distinguished College or University Teaching of Mathematics of the Mathematical Association of America.

== Personal life ==
Hodge-Zickerman is also a long-distance runner who has competed in marathons and ultramarathons.
