= Monique Chyba =

Control theorist

Monique Chyba (born 1969) is a control theorist who works as a professor of mathematics at the University of Hawaiʻi at Mānoa. Her work on control theory has involved the theory of singular trajectories, and applications in the control of autonomous underwater vehicles. More recently, she has also applied control theory to the prediction and modeling of the spread of COVID-19 in Hawaii.

== Education and career ==
Chyba's parents Mirek and Jana Chyba were Czech, but settled in Geneva, Switzerland. Chyba earned a Ph.D. through the University of Burgundy in Dijon, France, in 1997, while working as a teaching assistant at the University of Geneva. Her dissertation, Le Cas Martinet en Geometrie Sous-Riemannienne [the Martinet case in sub-Riemannian geometry], was supervised by Bernard Bonnard.

After postdoctoral research at Pierre and Marie Curie University, Harvard University, INRIA Sophia Antipolis, Princeton University, and the University of California, Santa Cruz, she joined the University of Hawaiʻi faculty in 2002. and was promoted to full professor in 2012.

== Book ==
Chyba is an author of the book Singular Trajectories and their Role in Control Theory (with Bernard Bonnard, Springer, 2003).

== Recognition ==
In 2014, Chiba University in Japan gave Chyba their Science and Lectureship Award. She was a 2025 recipient of the Deborah and Franklin Haimo Awards for Distinguished College or University Teaching of Mathematics.
