= Chris Stevens (mathematician) =

American mathematician

Terrie Christine Stevens, also known as T. Christine Stevens, is an American mathematician whose research concerns topological groups, the history of mathematics, and mathematics education. She is also known as the co-founder of Project NExT, a mentorship program for recent doctorates in mathematics, which she directed from 1994 until 2009.

== Education and career ==
Stevens graduated from Smith College in 1970, and completed her doctorate in 1978 at Harvard University under the supervision of Andrew M. Gleason. Her dissertation was Weakened Topologies for Lie Groups.

She held teaching positions at the University of Massachusetts Lowell, at Mount Holyoke College and at Arkansas State University before joining Saint Louis University, where for 25 years she was a professor of mathematics and computer science.

She was also a Congressional Science Fellow assisting congressman Theodore S. Weiss in 1984–1985, and was a program officer at the National Science Foundation in 1987–1989. After retiring from SLU, she became Associate Executive Director for Meetings and Professional Services of the American Mathematical Society. She also served as an AMS Council member at large from 2011 to 2013.

== Recognition ==
In 1997 Stevens received the Deborah and Franklin Haimo Award for Distinguished College or University Teaching of Mathematics.

In 2004 she won the Gung and Hu Award for Distinguished Service to Mathematics of the Mathematical Association of America for her work on Project NExT.

In 2010 she was awarded the Smith College Medal by her alma mater.

She has been a fellow of the American Association for the Advancement of Science since 2005, and in 2012, she became one of the inaugural fellows of the American Mathematical Society.

She was the 2015 winner of the Louise Hay Award of the Association for Women in Mathematics.
