= Research statement =

A research statement is a summary of research achievements and an overview of plans for upcoming research. It often includes both current aims and findings, and future goals. Research statements are usually requested as part of a relevant job application process, and often assist in the identification of appropriate applicants.

A typical research statement follows a typical pattern in regard to layout, and often includes features of other research documents including an abstract, research background and goals. Often these reports are tailored towards specific audiences, and may be used to showcase job proficiency or underline particular areas of research within a program.

== Purpose ==
The purpose of a research statement is to let the viewers (e.g. an academic student or a research committee) know the essence of the research document, the main points of the research and where the research will lead to later on. The later paragraphs of a statement might highlight the benefits that the research report will provide to its relevant subject field. A research statement if done properly can be successful in answering the questions below:

1. What is your interest in the research study?
2. What were the unsolved questions that compelled a student to undertake the study?
3. What are the major accomplishments that resulted from the study?
4. What methodologies were used in collection and analysis of data for the research project?
5. What were the factors that limited the scope of the research?
6. What other challenges were encountered during the research and how were they overcome?
7. What is the application of your research in society?
8. What is the importance of the research project within its relevant field?
9. Does your research pave the way for further studies in the field?

Academic researchers stress the point that a research statement cannot simply be answered by saying yes or no but is supported by valid evidences.

== Content ==
The content of a research statement is concerned with 3 main elements:

=== Considerations for recent research ===
The research statement of college students or recent graduates discusses the thesis required in college or university.

- It should enable a student who has created several research studies on similar topics, to create a link between them.
- It should discuss the student’s interest in the relevant academic field.
- It should discuss the importance, applications and the contribution it makes to the relevant field.
- It should briefly describe the contribution of every student in the research project, if the research was made as a team.
- It should include an acknowledgement of the work of other researchers in the field.

=== Considerations for future research ===
- It should discuss the short-term goals of the research study that will be conducted in the future.
- A few research concepts on which one plans to work should be listed.
- It should discuss how a recent piece of work paved the path for the planned research.
- Discuss where the funds will be sourced to sponsor the research project, who will be the collaborative partners and what facilities will be used.
- It will discuss in what ways the research objectives match with departmental objectives.
- It will discuss the long-term goals of the research studies, i.e. the objectives that it hopes to achieve after more than five years.

=== Considerations for details ===
- It should discuss the research plan in practical and realistic ways.
- It should give due attention to the highlights of the research but should not go into too much details.
- To support the research, some illustrations, graphs and charts should also be included.

== For quantitative research ==
Quantitative research statements are based on the logic of deduction and are formed by identifying the variables of a general theory and observing a few selected variables. Some of the main research statements for quantitative researches are:

- Descriptive research statements
- Relational research statements
- Difference research statements

== For qualitative research ==
Qualitative research statements are based on inductive reasoning and are restated several times during the collection of data. They explain what influence qualitative statements or variables have in decision making under uncertain conditions. Some of the main research statements for qualitative researches are:

- Ethnographic research statements
- Historical research statements
- Legal research statements

== Types ==
Usually two types of research statements are formed for a research paper.

- Objective Research Statement: An objective research statement gives a balanced overview of the whole of the research study.
- Subjective Research Statement: The subjective research statement is based on the results of research analysis.

== See also ==
- Grey literature
- Research proposal
- Thesis
