= Age of the captain =

Mathematical word problem

The age of the captain is a mathematical word problem which cannot be answered even though there seems to be plenty of information supplied. It was given for the first time by Gustave Flaubert in a letter to his sister Caroline in 1841:

Puisque tu fais de la géométrie et de la trigonométrie, je vais te donner un problème : Un navire est en mer, il est parti de Boston chargé de coton, il jauge 200 tonneaux. Il fait voile vers le Havre, le grand mât est cassé, il y a un mousse sur le gaillard d’avant, les passagers sont au nombre de douze, le vent souffle N.-E.-E., l’horloge marque 3 heures un quart d’après-midi, on est au mois de mai…. On demande l’âge du capitaine ?

Translation:

Since you are now studying geometry and trigonometry, I will give you a problem. A ship sails the ocean. It left Boston with a cargo of cotton. It grosses 200 tons. It is bound for Le Havre. The mainmast is broken, the cabin boy is on deck, there are 12 passengers aboard, the wind is blowing East-North-East, the clock points to a quarter past three in the afternoon. It is the month of May. How old is the captain?

More recently, a simpler version has been used to study how students react to word problems:

A captain owns 26 sheep and 10 goats. How old is the captain?

Many children in elementary school, from different parts of the world, attempt to "solve" this nonsensical problem by giving the answer 36, obtained by adding the numbers 26 and 10. It has been suggested that this indicates schooling and education fail to instill critical thinking in children, and do not teach them that a question may be unsolvable. However, others have countered that in education students are taught that all questions have a solution and that giving any answer is better than leaving it blank, hence the attempt to "solve" it.

This problem also appears in Richard Rusczyk's Introduction to Geometry at the end of chapter 18 in the "extra" box, as well as in Evan Chen's Euclidean Geometry in Mathematical Olympiads at the beginning of chapter 5.

== Variations ==
In 2018, the question "If a ship had 26 sheep and 10 goats onboard, how old is the ship's captain?" appeared in a fifth-grade examination for 11-year-old students of a Shunqing primary school. A Weibo commenter noted that the total weight of 26 average sheep and 10 average goats is 7,700 kg (8.5 short tons). In China, one needs to have possessed a boat license for five years to drive a ship with over 5,000 kg (5.5 short tons) of cargo. As the minimum age to get a boat's license is 23, the captain is at least 28. The statutory retirement age in China is 60 for men and up to 55 for women, thus the captain's age is between 28 and 60.

Some versions begin with a statement like "Imagine you're a ship's captain", before distracting the answerer with much irrelevant information. The answer is simply the age of the answerer.
