= Ralph E. Diefenderfer =

American politician and educator (1887–1968)

Member of the Pennsylvania House of Representatives from the Lehigh County district
- In office 1915–1916

Personal details
- Born: Ralph Edgar Diefenderfer; April 22, 1887 Lehigh County, Pennsylvania, U.S.
- Died: February 19, 1968 (aged 80) Newton, New Jersey, U.S.
- Party: Democratic
- Spouse(s): Idella Gerhard (died) Doris Miller (died)
- Children: 2
- Occupation: Politician; educator

Ralph Edgar Diefenderfer (April 22, 1887 – February 19, 1968) was a politician and educator from Pennsylvania. He served as a member of the Pennsylvania House of Representatives, representing Lehigh County, from 1915 to 1916.

== Early life ==
Ralph Edgar Diefenderfer was born on April 22, 1887, in Orefield (or Siegersville), Lehigh County, Pennsylvania, to Emma (née Muir) and Victor A. Diefenderfer. He was educated at Schnecksville Normal School and received a teacher's certificate. He graduated from Perkiomen Seminary.

== Career ==
Diefenderfer worked as a teacher in a one-room schoolhouse in Kernsville and Stiles and was employed in a general merchandise store. He was a member of the school board in North Whitehall Township from 1911 to 1913. He was secretary-treasurer of the North Whitehall supervisors and also served as justice of the peace in his township.

Diefenderfer was a Democrat. He served as a member of the Pennsylvania House of Representatives, representing Leigh County, from 1915 to 1916. He was unsuccessful in his re-election in 1917. He was one of the founders of the North Whitehall Democratic Club. He served as recorder of deeds from 1936 to 1943. He was the first president of the Pennsylvania Association of Recorders in 1938.

Diefenderfer worked as a laboratory assistant in Lehigh County.

== Personal life ==
Diefenderfer married twice. He married Idella Gerhard. She died. He then married Doris Miller. She also predeceased him. He had two daughters, Elsie and Doris. Later in life, Diefenderfer took up the hobbies of gardening and dowsing.

Diefenderfer died on February 19, 1968, at the home of his daughter in Newton, New Jersey.
