= Olympia Nicodemi =

American mathematician

Olympia E. Nicodemi is a mathematician and mathematics educator whose research interests range from wavelets to the history of mathematics. She was a distinguished teaching professor of mathematics at the State University of New York at Geneseo until 2020, when she retired.

== Career and publications ==
Nicodemi did her undergraduate studies at New York University, and completed her Ph.D. at the University of Rochester. She joined the faculty at SUNY Geneseo in 1981. She is the author of Discrete Mathematics: A Bridge to Computer Science and Advanced Mathematics (West Publishing, 1987) and An Introduction to Abstract Algebra: With Notes to the Future Teacher (with Melissa A. Sutherland and Gary W. Towsley, Pearson, 2007).

== Recognition ==
Nicodemi was one of the 2004 winners of the Deborah and Franklin Haimo Awards for Distinguished College or University Teaching of Mathematics, an award given by the Mathematical Association of America to outstanding mathematics teachers whose effectiveness extends beyond their own campuses. The award particularly cited her role in the growth of the number of mathematics students at her campus, approximately 2/3 of whom were female.
