= Jennifer Switkes =

Canadian-American applied mathematician

- Education: Claremont Graduate University
- Awards: Inspiring Women in STEM Award of Insight Into Diversity Magazine; Deborah and Franklin Haimo Awards for Distinguished College or University Teaching of Mathematics

Jennifer Switkes is a Canadian-American applied mathematician interested in mathematical modeling and operations research, and also known for her volunteer work teaching mathematics in prisons. She is an associate professor of mathematics at California State Polytechnic University, Pomona (Cal Poly Pomona), where she is associate chair of the mathematics department.

== Early life and education ==
Switkes was born in Canada but moved as a child to Northern California. She is a 1994 graduate of Harvey Mudd College, where she completed a double major in mathematics and physics as well as earning credits towards a teaching credential. However, her experience as a student teacher at a middle school convinced her that she was not fully prepared to continue as a teacher, and she returned to graduate school instead.

Her doctoral research at Claremont Graduate University concerned mathematical biology, and more specifically mosaic coevolution; her 2000 dissertation, The Geographic Mosaic Theory in Relation to Coevolutionary Interactions, was jointly supervised by Michael E. Moody and John Angus.

== Career and volunteer work ==
Switkes was an instructor at Citrus College and the University of Redlands before becoming a mathematics professor at Cal Poly Pomona in 2001. There, she is known for her project-based education of students, centered around real-world applications of mathematical modeling.

Switkes volunteers as an associate pastor at the Orange Coast Free Methodist Church in Costa Mesa, California, and as a mathematics teacher with the Prison Education Project. She has taught mathematics to prison inmates both at the California Rehabilitation Center in Norco, California and in Uganda, where she has traveled repeatedly on church missions, on a 2013 sabbatical visit to Makerere University and on a shorter 2015 visit to teach at the Luzira Maximum Security Prison. As inspiration for her volunteer work she cites a book by Bob Moses, Radical Equations—Civil Rights from Mississippi to the Algebra Project, on the importance of mathematical literacy in escaping underprivileged circumstances.

== Recognition ==
Switkes was one of the winners of the 2015 Inspiring Women in STEM Award of Insight Into Diversity Magazine. In 2019, Switkes won one of the Deborah and Franklin Haimo Awards for Distinguished College or University Teaching of Mathematics, the highest teaching award of the Mathematical Association of America, "for bringing her educational core values of excellence, honor, integrity, love, and purpose to all students, and specifically to traditionally underserved students". The award recognized both her prison volunteer work and her mentorship of undergraduate and master's students at Cal Poly Pomona. She was also honored as an outstanding alumna of Harvey Mudd College in 2019.
