= Michael Dorff =

American mathematician

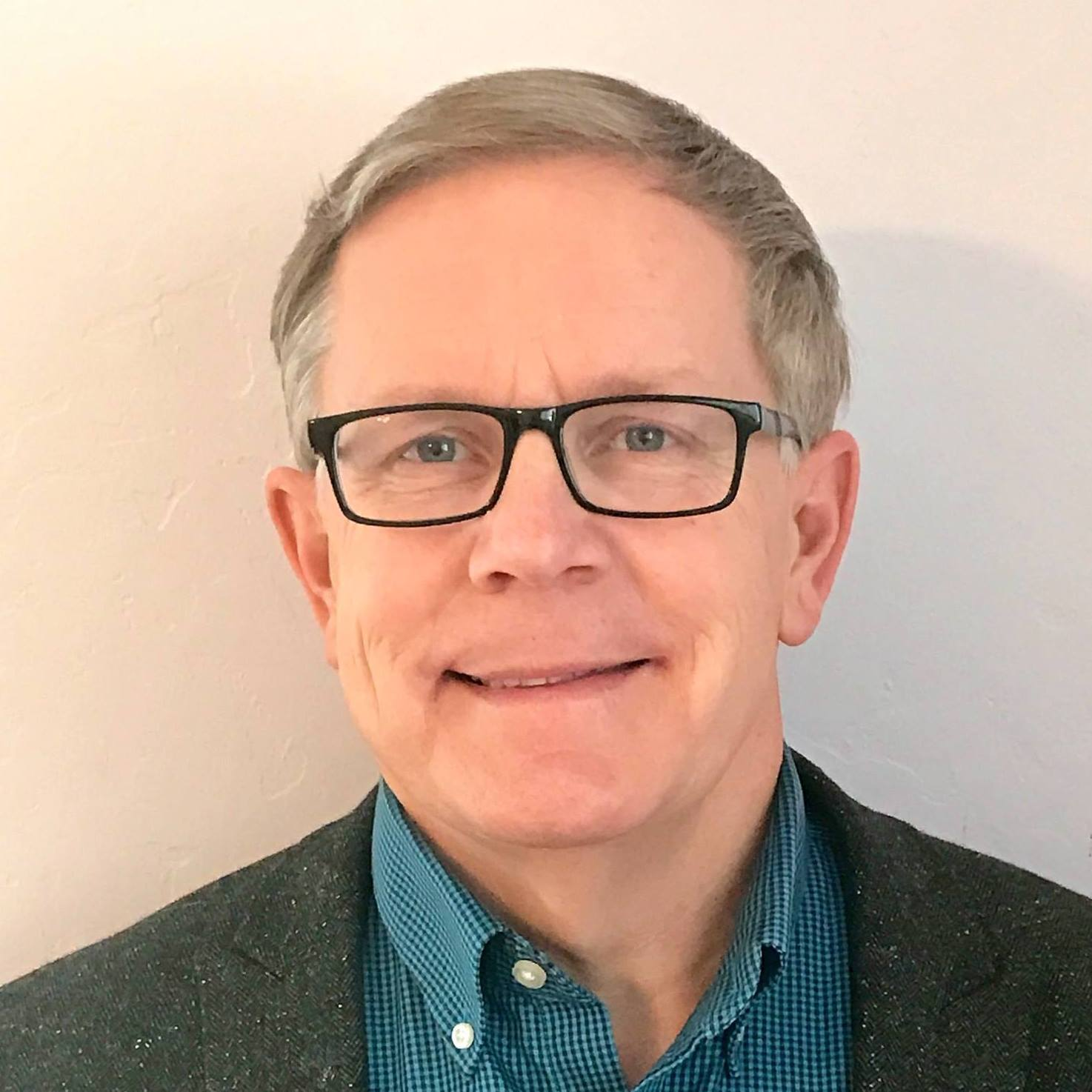
- Citizenship: United States
- Education: University of Kentucky
- Known for: Harmonic mappings, undergraduate research
- Spouse: Sarah Dorff
- Children: Rebecca Dorff, Elizabeth Dorff, Hannah Dorff, Abigail Dorff, Rachel Dorff
- Awards: Haimo Award; Fellow of the American Mathematical Society; President-elect of the Mathematical Association of America
- Scientific career
- Fields: Mathematics
- Workplaces: Brigham Young University
- Thesis: The Inner Mapping Radius And Construction Of Harmonic, Univalent Mappings Of The Unit Disk (1997)
- Doctoral advisor: Ted Joe Suffridge

Michael John Dorff (often referred to as Coach Dorff) is a mathematician at Brigham Young University known for his work in undergraduate research, promoting careers in math, popularizing mathematics, and harmonic mappings.

== Life and career ==
Michael Dorff received his BA in Mathematics Education from Brigham Young University in 1986. He received his MS from University of New Hampshire in 1992 followed by a Ph.D. in Mathematics from University of Kentucky in 1997. He taught at University of Missouri-Rolla as an assistant professor in the Department of Math and Statistics from 1997-2000 when he was hired by Brigham Young University as an assistant professor in the Department of Mathematics. Dorff became a full professor at BYU in 2011. He was the Chair of the Department of Mathematics at BYU from 2015–2019 and 2025-2028.

He is a Fellow of the American Mathematical Society (AMS), a CUR Fellow (Council on Undergraduate Research), and a Fulbright Scholar. He was awarded with the MAA Gung and Hu Award for Distinguished Service to Mathematics (2024), BYU University Professor (2023), BYU Lawrence K. Egbert Teaching and Learning Faculty Fellowship (2015), MAA Deborah and Franklin Tepper Haimo Award for Distinguished College or University Teaching of Mathematics (2010), and BYU Karl G. Maeser Excellence in Teaching Award (2010).

His mathematics research area is geometric function theory, and he has expertise in preparing students for careers in BIG (business, industry, and government) and in undergraduate research.

== Awards and honors ==
- 2025–2027, Member of the Mathematical Sciences Education Board for the National Academies of Science
- 2021–2024, Executive Director of Transforming Post-Secondary Education in Mathematics (TPSE Math)
- 2020, Council on Undergraduate Research (CUR) Fellows Award.
- 2019–2020, President of the Mathematical Association of America.
- 2015, The "Mathematics Programs that Make a Difference" from the AMS for CURM.
- 2013–2024 Co-founder and co-director of PIC Math (Preparation for Industrial Careers in the Mathematical Sciences)
- 2012–2015, The Lawrence K. Egbert Teaching and Learning Faculty Fellowship at Brigham Young University.
- 2012, Fellow of the American Mathematical Society.
- 2010, The Karl G. Maeser Excellence in Teaching Award at Brigham Young University.
- 2010, The Deborah and Franklin Tepper Haimo Award for Distinguished College or University Teaching of Mathematics.
- 2007–2017, Founder and director of the Center for Undergraduate Research in Mathematics (CURM)

== Selected publications ==
Books:

- M. Dorff, A. Henrich, and L. Pudwell. A Mathematician's Practical Guide to Mentoring Undergraduate Research. MAA Press: An Imprint of the American Mathematical Society, 2019.
- M. Brilleslyper, M. Dorff, J. McDougall, J. Rolf, L. Schaubroeck, R. Stankewitz, and K. Stephenson. Explorations in Complex Analysis. Math. Assoc. of America. Washington, DC, 2012.

Research Papers:

- M. Brilleslyper, J. Brooks, M. Dorff, R. Howell and L. Schaubroeck. “Zeros of a one-parameter family of harmonic trinomials,” accepted for publication in Proc. Amer. Math. Soc., 2020.
- Z. Boyd*, M. Dorff, M. Nowak, M. Romney, and M. Woloszkiewicz. “Univalency of convolutions of harmonic mappings,” Appl. Math. Comput. 234 (2014), 326–332.
- M. Dorff, M. Nowak, and M. Wołoszkiewicz. “Convolutions of harmonic convex mappings.” Complex Var. Elliptic Equ. 57 (2012), no. 5, 489–503.
- M. Dorff and M. Nowak. “Landau's Theorem for planar harmonic mappings.” Comput. Methods Funct. Theory 4 (2004), no. 1, 151–158.
- M. Dorff. “Convolutions of planar harmonic convex mappings.” Complex Var. Theory Appl. 45 (2001), 263–271.
