= Journal of General Education =

- Discipline: Education
- Language: English
- Edited by: Elizabeth Jones, Claire Major

Publication details
- History: 1946-present
- Publisher: Penn State University Press (United States)
- Frequency: Quarterly

Standard abbreviations
- ISO 4: J. Gen. Educ.

Indexing
- ISSN: 0021-3667 (print); 1527-2060 (web)
- JSTOR: 00213667
- OCLC no.: 42432120

Links
- Journal homepage; Online access

Journal of General Education is an academic journal devoted to issues regarding general education in the United States. It is published quarterly by the Penn State University Press.
