= Judy L. Walker =

American mathematician

Aaron Douglas Professor of Mathematics Judy L. Walker
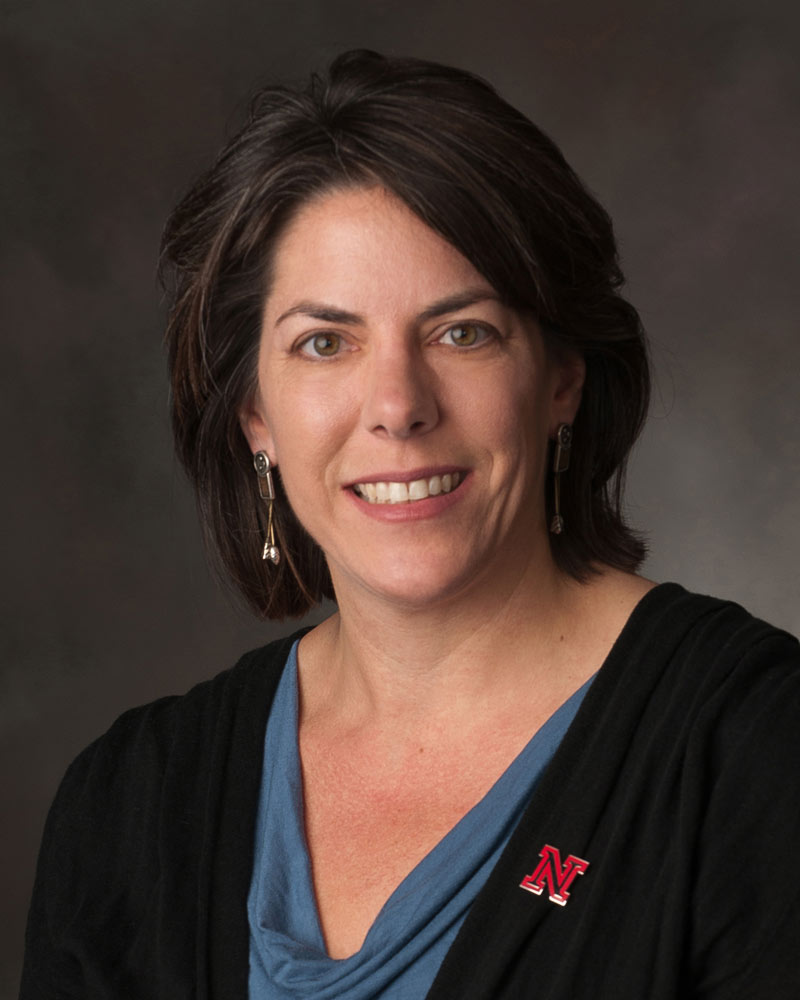
- Judy L. Walker
- Education: University of Michigan, B.S. cum laude University of Illinois, M.S., Ph.D.
- Scientific career
- Fields: Mathematics, Algebraic coding
- Workplaces: University of Nebraska–Lincoln
- Thesis: Algebraic Geometric Codes over Rings (1996)
- Doctoral advisor: Nigel Boston
- Website: www.math.unl.edu/~jwalker7/

Judy Leavitt Walker is an American mathematician. She is the Aaron Douglas Professor of Mathematics at the University of Nebraska–Lincoln, where she chaired the mathematics department from 2012 through 2016 and currently serves as the Associate Vice Chancellor for Faculty Affairs. Her research is in the area of algebraic coding theory.

In 2012, Walker became one of the inaugural Fellows of the American Mathematical Society.

Throughout her career, Walker has worked on issues related to women in mathematics. She is co-founder of the University of Nebraska's All Girls/All Math program for high school girls; she represented her department at the White House when they were recognized with a 1998 Presidential Award for Excellence in Science, Mathematics, and Engineering mentoring; and she is co-founder of the Nebraska Conference for Undergraduate Women in Mathematics.

== Education ==
Walker graduated from the University of Michigan in 1990, and went on to graduate studies at the University of Illinois at Urbana–Champaign, earning her Ph.D. in 1996 under the supervision of Nigel Boston.

== Career ==
She joined the University of Nebraska–Lincoln faculty in 1996, was promoted to full professor in 2006 and took up the Aaron Douglas Professorship in 2012. She held a visiting professorship at École Polytechnique Fédérale de Lausanne (EPFL) during fall 2011.

== Academic interests ==
Walker's research is in coding theory, i.e., the study of error-correcting codes. Her primary contributions have been in algebraic geometry codes and low-density parity check codes.

== Selected awards ==
- Louise Hay Award (Association for Women in Mathematics, 2016)
- Outstanding Teaching and Instructional Creativity Award (University of Nebraska system, 2014)
- George Pólya Lecturer (Mathematical Association of America, 2009-2011)
- Deborah and Franklin Haimo Award for Distinguished College or University Teaching of Mathematics (Mathematical Association of America, 2006)
- Irving Reiner Memorial Award (University of Illinois Department of Mathematics, 1996)
- Fellow of the Association for Women in Mathematics (2019)
- 2021 class of Fellows of the American Association for the Advancement of Science.

== Selected publications ==
- C. Curto, V. Itskov, K. Morrison, Z. Roth, J. Walker (2013), "Combinatorial neural codes from a mathematical coding theory perspective", Neural Computation, 25, No. 7: 1891-1925. Online pdf
- N. Axvig, D.T. Dreher, K. Morrison, E. Psota, L.C. Pérez, J. Walker (2009), "Analysis of connections between pseudocodewords", IEEE Transactions on Information Theory, 55: 4099-4107. Online pdf
- Koetter, Ralf; Li, Wen-Ching W.; Vontobel, Pascal O.; Walker, Judy L. (2007), "Characterizations of pseudo-codewords of (low-density) parity-check codes", Advances in Mathematics, 213 (1): 205–229, doi:10.1016/j.aim.2006.12.010, MR 2331243. Online PDF
- Silverberg, Alice; Staddon, Jessica; Walker, Judy L. (2003), "Applications of list decoding to tracing traitors", IEEE Transactions on Information Theory, 49 (5): 1312–1318, Bibcode:2003ITIT...49.1312S, doi:10.1109/TIT.2003.810630, MR 1984829. Online pdf
- J. Walker (2000), "Codes and Curves", Student Mathematical Library, IAS/Park City Mathematical Subseries, 7. American Mathematical Society, Providence, RI. Online pdf
- J.-F. Voloch, J. Walker (2000), "Euclidean weights of codes from elliptic curves over rings", Trans. Amer. Math. Soc., 352: 5063–5076. Online pdf
- J. Walker (1999), "Algebraic geometric codes over rings", Journal of Pure and Applied Algebra, 144: 91-110. Online pdf
- J. Walker (1997), "The Nordstrom Robinson code is algebraic geometric", IEEE Transactions on Information Theory, 43: 1588-1593.
