= Project NExT =

MAA Project NExT (New Experiences in Teaching) is a program sponsored by the Mathematical Association of America (MAA) to aid in the professional development of mathematicians, statisticians, and mathematics educators after they receive their PhDs. It involves workshops and lectures on teaching, academic research, academic scholarship, and professional activities. The participants in the program are called Project NExT Fellows or sometimes Dots, and the program also provides ample networking opportunities for them. Each fellow is also provided with a consultant, who serves as a mentor for them.

== History ==
Project NExT was founded by James (Jim) Leitzel (Ohio State University) and Chris Stevens (Saint Louis University). The first fellows were selected in 1994. Jim Leitzel died in 1998, and Aparna Higgins (University of Dayton) and Joe Gallian (University of Minnesota Duluth) became co-directors of Project NExT. Chris Stevens stepped down as director in 2010, and was succeeded by Aparna Higgins and Joe Gallian. Judith Covington (Louisiana State University, Shreveport) and Gavin LaRose (University of Michigan) first served as Associate Co-Directors and later became Co-Directors. In 2007, the total number of fellows surpassed 1000. By 2017 the total number of fellows reached 1700. In 2023 Christine Kelley became director.

== Selection of fellows ==
The program is aimed at faculty who are in the early stages of their higher ed teaching career, in a mathematics (or closely related) department, after receiving their doctorate. Fellows are selected based on an application, including a short curriculum vitae, a research statement, and a teaching statement expressing interest in the program. The application also requires a letter from the applicant's department chair guaranteeing funding to attend several conferences. The number of selected fellows depends on funding. Currently, just under 100 are selected each year.

== The program ==
Project NExT is a professional development program for college-level faculty interested in teaching. The program provides workshops and an electronic mailing list for its members. Fellows participate in MathFest during the year of their selection and the year after, and in the Joint Mathematics Meeting in the January after their selection as fellows. Each fellow is also assigned a consultant outside of their own institution. NExT fellows organize several sessions at the Joint Meeting and MathFest, on topics of their choosing.

Since 2016, all MAA Project NExT events at the Joint Mathematics Meetings have been open to all conference attendees.

== Affiliation with other professional development organizations ==
The national Project NExT program is strongly affiliated with Section NExT programs, which are run by local sections of the MAA, and involve many of the same activities. Section NExT fellows can also participate in the national workshops.

Project NExT is also strongly associated with the Young Mathematicians Network.

== See also ==
- Mathematical Association of America
