= Martindale (surname) =

Martindale is a surname, and may refer to:

- Adam Martindale (1623–1686), leading 17th century English Presbyterian minister
- Andrew Martindale (1932–1995), British art historian
- Ben Hay Martindale (1824–1904), British public servant in Canada and Australia
- Billy Martindale (born 1938), American golfer
- Colin Martindale (1943–2008), American psychologist
- C. C. Martindale (1879–1963), English priest and writer
- Dale Martindale (born 1961), Canadian vocalist
- Dave Martindale (born 1964), English footballer
- David Martindale (born 1974), Scottish football manager
- Don Martindale (born 1963), American football coach
- Doug Martindale (born 1947), Canadian politician
- Duncan Martindale (born 1963), English cricketer
- Elijah Martindale (1793–1874), American pioneer
- Elsie Martindale known after marriage as Elsie M. Hueffer (1876–1949), English translator
- Frederick C. Martindale (1865–1928), American politician
- Gary Martindale (born 1971), English footballer
- Hattie Martindale (1838–1919), the "Veiled Lady of Kirtland"
- Henry C. Martindale (1780–1860), Congressman from New York
- Henry Martindale (priest) (1879–1946), British Anglican Archdeacon of Bombay
- Hilda Martindale (1875–1952), British civil servant and author
- James B. Martindale (1836–1904), American attorney
- John H. Martindale (1815–1881), Union general
- John Robert Martindale (born 1935), English historian
- Justin Martindale, American comedian
- Ken Martindale (1932–2015), British businessman
- Leah Martindale (born 1978), Barbadian swimmer
- Len Martindale (1920–1971), English footballer
- Louisa Martindale (1872–1966), British surgeon
- Louisa Martindale (feminist) (1839–1914), British activist for women's rights
- Manny Martindale (1909–1972), West Indian cricketer
- Marianne Martindale known as Miss Martindale, English writer and columnist
- Margo Martindale (born 1951), American character actress
- Mark Martindale, American biologist
- Miles Martindale (1756–1824), English Wesleyan minister
- Natalie Martindale (born 1977), Saint Vincent and the Grenadines sprinter
- Nell Martindale (1891–1976), American physical educator
- Thomas Martindale (1845–1916) English-born American merchant, grocer
- Wallace Smith Martindale III, (born 1930), American mathematician
- William Martindale (1840–1902), pharmacist and founding editor of Martindale: The Extra Pharmacopoeia
- Wink Martindale (1933–2025), American disc jockey, radio personality, and game show host
