= Martindale =

Martindale may refer to:

== People ==
- Martindale (surname)

== Places ==
- Martindale, Cumbria, England
- Martindale Heights, St. Catharines, Ontario
- Martindale, Pennsylvania
- Martindale, Texas
- Martindale, Washington
- Martindale, New South Wales, Australia
- Martindale, Calgary, a neighbourhood
  - Martindale station, a C-Train station in the neighbourhood
- Martindale, Eastern Cape, a farming community near Bathurst in South Africa
- Martindale (NYCRR station), a former railway station in Hillsdale, New York
- Martindale Hall a Georgian-style mansion near Mintaro, South Australia on the site of Martindale sheep station

== Science ==
- Martindale (unit), unit for measuring abrasion resistance of textiles

== Publications ==
- Martindale: The Complete Drug Reference, a medicines information resource
- Martindale-Hubbell, a catalogue of lawyers in the United States
