= Cleminson =

Cleminson is a surname. Notable people with the surname include:

- James Cleminson (1921–2010), British soldier and businessman
- James Cleminson (1840–1896), inventor of Cleminson's patent axle system for railway rolling stock
- Zal Cleminson (born 1949), Scottish guitarist
