= Elijah Martindale =

- Born: November 10, 1793; Laurens County, South Carolina, U.S.
- Died: July 21, 1874 (aged 80); New Castle, Indiana, U.S.
- Resting place: Crown Hill Cemetery and Arborteum Sec 24, Lot 1; 39.8177345°N 86.1716127°W
- Other names: Elder Elijah Martindale
- Children: James B. Martindale

Elijah Martindale (November 10, 1793 – July 21, 1874) was an American pioneer and a leader of the Restoration Movement in Indiana. He was often called "Elder Elijah Martindale".

== Biography ==
Martindale was born in Laurens County, South Carolina. He moved with his family to Warren County, Ohio in 1801 where they established a farm outside Waynesville, Ohio. The family lived there self-sufficiently, making their own clothes and raising their own food. In 1811, Martindale's father was determined to move again, and he resettled the family to Whitewater Valley, Indiana Territory, on a brook now called Martindale Creek. The family constructed a cabin in October and cleared 10 acres (40,000 m^{2}) by the following spring. During the aftermath of the Battle of Tippecanoe and the War of 1812, the neighboring settlers decided to erect a small fort around the Martindale cabin. Uncomfortable with the rough lifestyle, Martindale's parents decided to move back to Ohio and to wait out the war there before returning to Indiana.

In October, 1815, Martindale married a Wayne County, Indiana, pioneer named Elizabeth Boyd. In the spring of 1832, Martindale moved with his wife to Flat Rock, Indiana, in Henry County. In 1865, they moved to New Castle, Indiana.

Martindale died in New Castle, Indiana, at the age of 80.

=== Ministry ===
In 1820, Martindale preached his first sermon. From then until his death, he preached throughout Henry County, Wayne County, Fayette County, Indiana; Rush County, Indiana, Delaware County, Indiana, Madison County, Indiana, Hancock County, Indiana, and Ohio. He organized Disciples of Christ churches throughout eastern Indiana and Ohio, including Hillsboro, Henry County, Indiana; New Lisbon, Indiana, Middletown, Indiana, Prairie Township, Indiana, Bentonville, Indiana, Plum Creek, Indiana, and Fairview, Indiana.

He is interred at South Mound Cemetery, New Castle, Indiana.

== Personal life ==
Elijah Martindale was the father of lawyer and businessman James B. Martindale, a founder of the noted legal reference and catalog of lawyers, the Martindale-Hubbell Law Directory.
