= Gail Letzter =

American mathematician (1960–2024)

- Born: September 12, 1960; New York
- Died: September 19, 2024 (aged 64); Rockville, Maryland
- Education: B.A., Harvard University; Ph.D., University of Chicago
- Known for: Theory of quantum symmetric pairs
- Scientific career
- Fields: Mathematics
- Workplaces: Wayne State University Virginia Tech National Security Agency
- Doctoral advisor: I.N. Herstein

Gail Rebecca Letzter (September 12, 1960 – September 19, 2024) was an American mathematician specializing in the representation theory of quantum groups, and formerly technical director of the mathematics research group of the National Security Agency.

== Education and career ==
Letzter was born in Nyack, New York. She received her B.A. from Harvard University in 1982 and her Ph.D. in mathematics from the University of Chicago in 1987. Letzter wrote her Ph.D. dissertation under I.N. Herstein and was later awarded a National Science Foundation Postdoctoral Fellowship supported by MIT. She held tenured positions in the mathematics departments at Wayne State University and Virginia Tech.

She served as Lie algebra editor of the Proceedings of the American Mathematical Society from 2007 - 2011. In 2008 she published a research memoir in the series Memoirs of the American Mathematical Society entitled Invariant Differential Operators for Quantum Symmetric Space. She has been an active member of the Association for Women in Mathematics (AWM), was elected as an at-large member of the executive committee of the association in 2015 and served on that body from 2016 - 2020. She chaired the AWM policy and advocacy committee from 2016 - 2018. She was one of the primary organizers of the 2015 AWM Research Symposium, which was held at the University of Maryland in College Park, Maryland. She was an editor of the proceedings of this research symposium.

== Research ==
1989 marked the beginning of a long collaboration with Anthony Joseph at the Weizmann Institute in Israel. Their joint investigations of quantum groups included the discovery of the locally finite part and other contributions, "which greatly contribute to our understanding of quantized enveloping algebras" according to one reviewer. Subsequently, Letzter began her own seminal analysis of quantum symmetric pairs from the perspective of Hopf algebras, culminating in a complete classification. This work has served as the basis for breakthrough research by others on canonical bases, categorification, and geometric representation theory.

== Recognition ==
Letzter was recognized as a fellow of the Association of Women in Mathematics (AWM) in the class of 2021. Her citation read "For work in government and in AWM on behalf of women in mathematics, leading the AWM Policy and Advocacy Committee to formally establish the Hill visits program to advocate for women and girls with members of Congress, and co-organizing the 2015 AWM symposium and editing its proceedings".

== Books ==
- Letzter, Gail (2008). Invariant Differential Operators for Quantum Symmetric Spaces. Providence, Rhode Island: American Mathematical Society. ISBN 9780821841310.
