= Hospital for Sick Children =

Institutions named (or formerly named) Hospital for Sick Children include:

- The Hospital for Sick Children (Toronto), a children's and teaching hospital in Canada
- Victoria Hospital for Sick Children, Toronto, a former hospital
- Victoria Hospital for Sick Children, Kingston upon Hull, a former hospital
- Great Ormond Street Hospital, London
- Evelina London Children's Hospital, London
- Royal Hospital for Children, Glasgow, Scotland
- Royal Hospital for Sick Children, Edinburgh, Scotland
- Royal Belfast Hospital for Sick Children, Northern Ireland
- Bristol Royal Hospital for Children, England
- Royal Alexandra Children's Hospital, Brighton, England
- Royal Alexandra Hospital for Children, Sydney, Australia
- Our Lady's Children's Hospital, Crumlin, Dublin, Ireland

== See also ==
- Children's hospital, the type of institution
