= Muggeridge =

Muggeridge is a surname of English origin, and may refer to:

- Douglas Muggeridge (1928–1985), British radio executive
- Edward Muggeridge (1830–1904), British photographer
- H. T. Muggeridge (1864–1942), British politician
- Karl Muggeridge (born 1974), Australian motorcycle racer
- Kitty Muggeridge (1903–1994), British writer
- Malcolm Muggeridge (1903–1990), British writer
- Maureen Muggeridge (1948–2010), British geologist
- Eadweard Muybridge (born Edward Muggeridge) (1830–1904), an English photographer
- Muggeridge (Surrey cricketer) (fl. around 1780), cricket player
