= James Cleminson =

British soldier and businessman

Sir James Arnold Stacey Cleminson KBE MC (31 August 1921 – 14 September 2010) was a prominent British soldier and businessman who was decorated for his service during the Battle of Arnhem after fighting in the North African Campaign and escaping while a prisoner of war in the Italian Campaign during the Second World War. He subsequently became chief executive, and then chairman, of Reckitt & Colman. Active from that period in the Confederation of British Industry, he became its president in 1984.

Cleminson was born in 1921 in Hull, East Riding of Yorkshire, to businessman Arnold Cleminson and his wife, Dr Florence Stacey-Cleminson, a physician at Victoria Children's Hospital. Clemison attended Rugby School; in 1940, immediately after leaving, he was called up for war service. He fought in the North African Campaign and was captured, being taken to Italy as a prisoner of war. There he escaped and walked through enemy lines to rejoin his regiment during the Italian Campaign. He subsequently joined the Parachute Regiment as a captain and participated in the Battle of Arnhem, where his platoon ambushed and killed the German garrison commander Major-General Friedrich Kussin. During the fighting, Cleminson found himself trapped in an attic with Major-General Roy Urquhart, who took exception to Cleminson's moustache, which he called "damned silly". For three days he fought in the village of Oosterbeek until he was wounded and captured. For his defence of the perimeter, Cleminson was awarded the Military Cross. He was later featured in the film A Bridge Too Far, played by Michael Graham Cox.

In early 1945, Cleminson was freed by American forces and accompanied Urquhart to Norway at the end of the conflict. On demobilisation in 1946, Cleminson joined his father's firm, which had merged with J. J. Colman to form Reckitt & Colman. The company produced a wide array of household goods. Cleminson advanced rapidly in the food division, known as Colman's, and was appointed to the Reckitt & Colman board. From 1973 he was chief executive and from 1976 chairman. In 1980 he also took a position with the Confederation of British Industry, which was suffering severely due to the effects of the 1973–75 recession. He remained there until 1986, spending the last two years as president, before retiring from both positions to become chairman of the British Overseas Trade Board.

In retirement, Cleminson held a number of chairman and board positions and was particularly active in Norfolk, where he was instrumental in the revitalisation of the Theatre Royal, Norwich. For his services to business, Cleminson was knighted in 1982 and in 1990 was further appointed Knight Commander of the Order of the British Empire. He was a keen sportsman.

On Cleminson's death aged 89 in September 2010, he was survived by his wife Judy and three children. He is buried in the graveyard of Barsham Church in Suffolk. Lady Cleminson died in 2019 at the age of 88.
