= Miriam Cohen =

Israeli mathematician

- מרים כהן
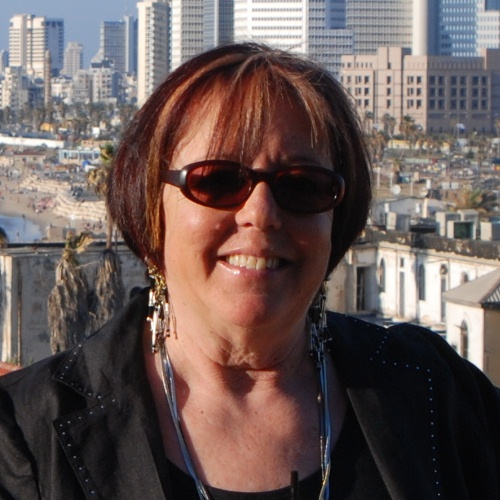
- Born: October 1941; Ramat Gan, British Mandate of Palestine
- Died: 5 November 2023 (aged 82)
- Education: California State University (B.Sc.), University of California, Los Angeles (M.Sc.), Tel Aviv University (Ph.D.)
- Known for: Research on Hopf algebras, quantum groups, and noncommutative rings
- Spouse: Yair Cohen
- Children: Omer, Ira, Alma, Adaya
- Awards: Fellow of the American Mathematical Society (2017)
- Scientific career
- Fields: Mathematics
- Workplaces: Ben-Gurion University of the Negev
- Doctoral advisor: Israel Nathan Herstein, A.A. Klein

Miriam Cohen (Hebrew: מרים כהן; born October 1941 – 5 November 2023) was an Israeli mathematician and a professor in the Department of Mathematics at Ben-Gurion University of the Negev whose main areas of research are Hopf algebras, quantum groups and Noncommutative rings.

== Biography ==
Miriam Cohen (née Hirsch) was born in Ramat Gan, British Mandate of Palestine. Her parents Dr. Hanna and Jusin Hirsch fled Nazi Germany to Palestine in 1939. She lived in Petah Tikva and joined the IDF communication corps in 1959. In 1961 she married Yair Cohen and in 1962 they left to study in the US. Miriam received her B.Sc. in Mathematics with High Honors from California State University and continued for her Ph.D. in Mathematics at UCLA where she received her M.Sc. After returning to Israel she completed her Ph.D. at Tel Aviv University under the supervision of Prof. Israel Nathan Herstein from the University of Chicago and Prof. A.A. Klein from Tel Aviv University. During these years the couple had four children (Omer, Ira, Alma and Adaya). In 1978 the family moved for idealistic reasons from Herzliya Pituach to the development town of Yeruham and lived there for 10 years. Miriam joined the faculty of the department of Mathematics at BGU and has been a member ever since. During her time as a researcher and lecturer at BGU she volunteered in educational projects in Yeruham (see below). In 1983–5 Cohen was a visiting Associate Professor at the University of Southern California and at UCLA in Los Angeles. In 1997–8 she was a visiting professor at the Mathematics Institute of Fudan University in Shanghai.

She was elected as a member of the 2017 class of Fellows of the American Mathematical Society "for contributions to Hopf algebras and their representations, and for service to the mathematical community".

== Functions in the Israeli mathematical community ==
- In 1992–94 she served as President of the Israel Mathematical Union.
- In 1996 she initiated and established the special track in Bioinformatics in the Department of Mathematics and Computer Sciences Department at BGU.
- In 1998–2002 she served as elected dean of the Faculty of Natural Sciences at BGU (the first woman in Israel to serve in this capacity) and was a member of the central steering committee and a member of the executive committee of BGU.
- In 2001 she founded the Center of Advanced Studies in Mathematics at BGU and has serves as its director since June 2003.
- She serves as associate editor in Communications in Algebra.
- In 1993–95 she served as Chairman of the Mathematics and Computer Science Department.

== Additional activities ==
- Initiation of the joint Israel Mathematical Union (IMU) and the American Mathematical Society (AMS) International meeting in 1995 and serves as member of the scientific committee of the second IMU and AMS meeting to take place in Israel in 2014.
- Since 2002 chair and member of the organizing and scientific committee of the Moshe Flato Colloquia series at BGU.
- Speaker at the Women Scientists Forum at the Israel Academy of Sciences and Humanities.
- Israeli delegate to the council of the European Mathematical Society (attended in this capacity the 1994 Council Meeting in Zurich). Chair of the session on Einstein and Quantum mechanics, Albert Einstein Legacy Symposium organized by the Israel Academy of Sciences and Humanities.
- Member of various professional committees such as the grant committee of the Clore Foundation for outstanding Ph.D. students, the professional evaluation committee of the Emet prize, the Harvey Award committee of the Technion and the advisory committee of the rector of Haifa University.

== Research grants ==
- U.S.–Israel Binational Fund (BSF) (with S. Montgomery). Quality of the completed work was rated excellent by the U.S. National Science Foundation.
- 1986–1989 A 3-year grant from The Basic Science Foundation, The Israel National Academy of Sciences and Humanities.
- 1991–1994 A 3-year grant from the Israel Ministry of Science together with Prof. Davidson of the Department of Physics at Ben-Gurion University. Prof. Nissimov and Prof. Pacheva.
- 1991–1994 A 3-year Grant from the Basic Science Foundation, The Israel National Academy of Sciences and Humanities.
- 1996–1999 A 3-year grant (with S. Westreich) from the Basic Science Foundation, the Israel National Academy of Sciences and Humanities. Research project on "Computer Algebra" jointly with the Institute of Mathematics and Informatics of the Bulgarian Academy of Sciences.
- 2001–2005 A 3-year grant from the US-Israel Binational Fund (BSF) (jointly with A. Yekutieli, M. Artin, J.Zhang)
- Since 2012 A 3-year grant (with S. Westreich) from the Basic Science Foundation, the Israel National Academy of Sciences and Humanities.

== Contribution to the community ==
- Founder of the computer summer camps projects in 1980. The camps catered to children from all over Israel and were a pioneering activity at that time.
- Chairman of the Education Subcommittee, Project Renewal, Yeroham. Voluntary high school teacher in mathematics in Yeruham.
- She served as a member of the Ministry of Education's Committee on Mathematics. Chair of its subcommittee on the Junior High level.
- Member of the National Committee on the Information Technology Society, appointed by the Prime Minister of Israel.
