= Brighton Girls =

Brighton Girls GDST

Location
- Montpelier Road (High&Sixth); Temple Gardens (Prep); Brighton and Hove, East Sussex, BN1 3AT (High&Sixth); BN1 3AS (Prep); England; 50.828°N 0.152°W

Information
- Type: Private day school
- Motto: Veritas est via
- Established: 1876
- Founder: Girls' Public Day School Company
- Head teacher: Melinda Shead
- Gender: Girls
- Colours: Dark green and turquoise
- Website: www.brightongirls.gdst.net

Brighton Girls, formerly Brighton and Hove High School, is a private day school for girls aged 4 to 18 in the city of Brighton and Hove, East Sussex, England and is part of the Girls' Day School Trust.

The school was founded in 1876 and has 450 pupils. The school has a Prep School (Early Years, Key stages 1 & 2), High and Sixth Form, making it the only all-through girls' school in Brighton.

Brighton Girls is one of the schools of the GDST (Girls' Day School Trust). Its main site is at Montpelier Road and includes the Temple building in the Montpelier area of the city with the Prep School opposite on Temple Gardens. In addition to netball courts, sports hall, gym and dance studio, the school also has its Astroturf playing field and further sports facilities on nearby Radinden Manor Road.

The Head of Brighton Girls is Melinda Shead, who started in the autumn term of 2025.

== History ==
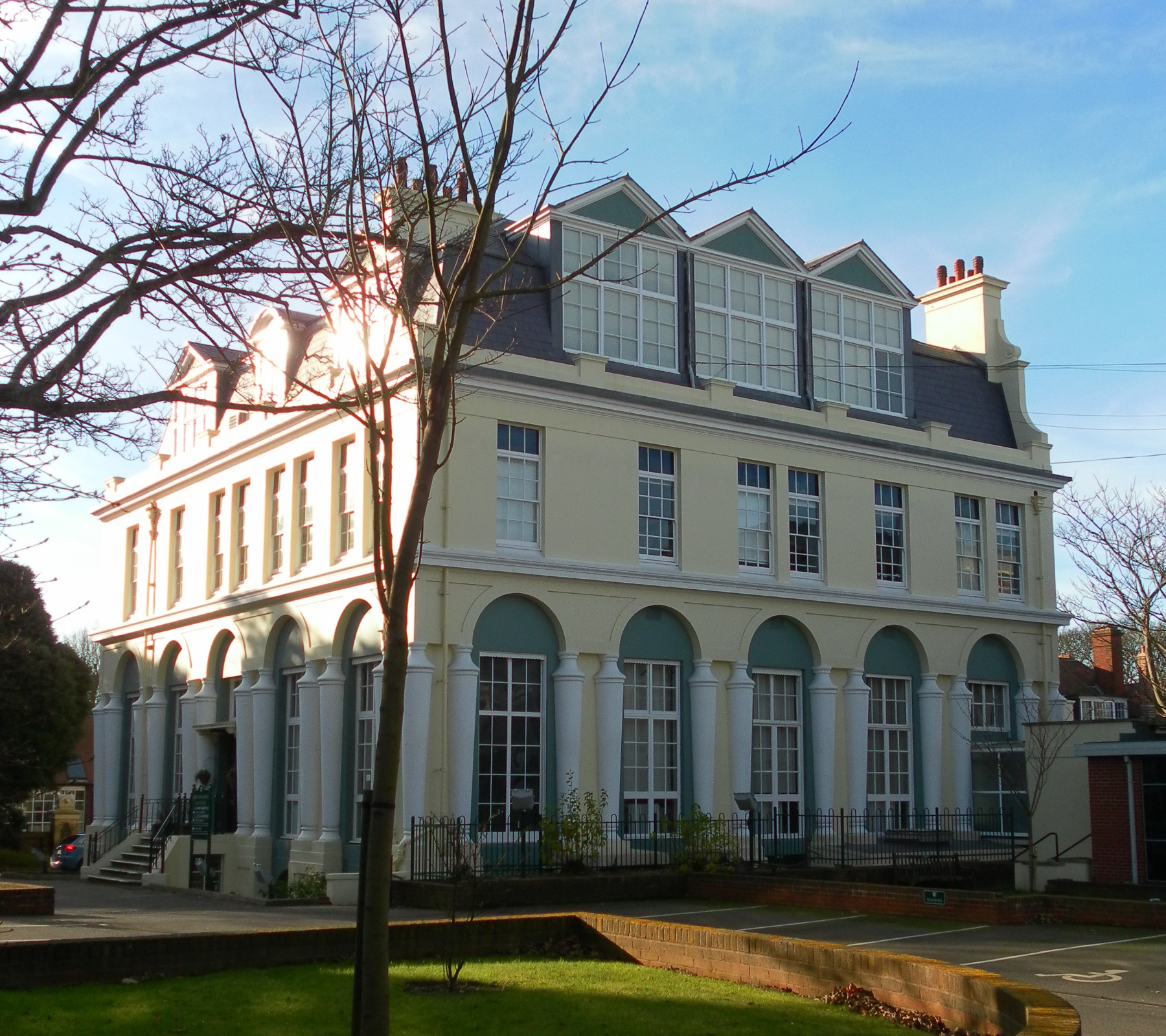
The main part of the school is housed in The Temple, Thomas Read Kemp's former home situated in the heart of Brighton.

Brighton Girls School was the tenth school founded by the Girls' Day School Trust in 1876. The first head of the school was Edith Creak who at twenty years old appointed the first staff. Creak had broken glass ceilings as one of the first women to study at Cambridge and to graduate from London University.

The school founders' names are now used as the houses, Stanley, Lyttleton, Grey and Gurney.

== Academics ==
Entrance examinations consist of: 11 + Maths, English & VR; 13+ Maths, English, Science, MFL; 16+ Minimum of 5 GCSE passes (including English Language & Maths) with 8/7 s in subjects to be pursued; applicants are also interviewed.

Pupils can take part in a number of societies and extra-curricular activities. School pupils are divided into four Houses: Grey, Gurney, Lyttelton and Stanley; the Houses compete in a series of events and competitions to earn points, which go towards the House Cup, also known as the Banfora Cup, at the end of each academic year.

In 2021, 26 per cent of the school's GCSE grades were grade 9, the highest, and another 26 per cent were grade 8.

== Rebranding ==
The school underwent a rebranding in late 2019, including the change of name (from 'Brighton and Hove High School' to 'Brighton Girls'), as a well as an updated logo.

== Notable alumni ==
- Alexandra Bastedo, actress
- Blanche Baughan, poet, writer, penal reformer
- Jasmine Birtles, financial and business journalist, author and presenter
- Elizabeth Beresford, creator of The Wombles
- Silkie Carlo, advocate
- Rosemary Coogan, astrophysicist, astronaut
- Beth Cordingly, actress
- Helen David, artist
- Grace Woodhead, philanthropist, pioneer of disability rights and mental health care
- Constance Garnett, translator
- Sally Greengross, equality campaigner, politician
- Louise Gullifer, Professor of English Law
- Margaret Joachim, politician and campaigner
- Martha Kearney, journalist
- Barbara Levick, historian
- Amy Levy, poet and writer
- Ida Lupino, actress
- Louisa Martindale, surgeon
- Hilda Martindale, civil servant and author
- Suzy Menkes, editor of the International Herald Tribune, journalist
- Gwenda Morgan, artist
- Maureen Muggeridge, geologist and gemologist
- Geraldine Newman, actress
- Lindsay Northover, Baroness Northover, politician
- Theodora Lisle Prankerd, botanist
- Rebecca Stott, author

== Notable staff ==
- Gabrielle Lambrick (1913–1968), civil servant, educator and historian taught at the school.

== See also ==
- Grade II listed buildings in Brighton and Hove: A–B
