= British Overseas Trade Board =

Former UK government agency

The British Overseas Trade Board was an export promotion agency of the UK Department of Trade and Industry from 1972 to 1988. It was set up in 1972 to replace the British Export Board.

== Chairmen ==
- Lord Thorneycroft 1972–1975
- Sir Frederick Catherwood 1975–1979
- Earl of Limerick 1979–1983
- Earl Jellicoe 1983–1987
- Sir James Cleminson, 1987–1988
