= Susan Montgomery =

American mathematician (born 1943)

M. Susan Montgomery
- Born: April 2, 1943 (age 83); Lansing, Michigan
- Education: University of Michigan, B.A. '65; University of Chicago, S.M. '66; University of Chicago, Ph.D. '69
- Known for: Structure and representations of Hopf algebras.
- Scientific career
- Fields: Mathematics
- Workplaces: USC
- Thesis: The Lie Structure of Simple Rings With Involution of Characteristic 2 (1969)
- Doctoral advisor: Israel Nathan Herstein

M. Susan Montgomery (born 2 April 1943 in Lansing, MI) is a distinguished American mathematician whose current research interests concern noncommutative algebras: in particular, Hopf algebras, their structure and representations, and their actions on other algebras. Her early research was on group actions on rings.

== Education ==
Montgomery received her B.A. in 1965 from the University of Michigan and her Ph.D. in Mathematics from the University of Chicago in 1969 under the supervision of I. N. Herstein.

== Career ==
Upon receiving her Ph.D. from Chicago, Montgomery spent one year on the faculty at DePaul University. Montgomery joined the faculty of the University of Southern California (USC) in 1970 and was promoted to the rank of Professor in 1982. She was chair of the Department of Mathematics at USC from 1996 to 1999. Montgomery has spent sabbaticals at the Hebrew University of Jerusalem, the University of Leeds, the University of Wisconsin, LMU Munich, the University of New South Wales, the Mittag-Leffler Institute, and the Mathematical Sciences Research Institute.

Montgomery wrote about a hundred research articles and several books, of which Hopf algebras and their actions on rings is her most cited work. This book includes a discussion of Hopf-Galois theory, an area to which Montgomery has significantly contributed, and an introduction to quantum group theory.

== Honors ==
Montgomery was awarded a Guggenheim Foundation Fellowship in 1984 and a Raubenheimer Outstanding Faculty Award by USC in 1987.

She gave an American Mathematical Society (AMS) Invited Address at the Joint Mathematics Meetings in 1984. In 1995 she gave an Invited Address at the Joint AMS-Israel Math Union Meeting in Jerusalem. In 2009, she gave a plenary lecture at the summer meeting of the Canadian Mathematical Society. She has also given numerous lectures at meetings and universities around the world.

Montgomery was the Principal Lecturer at the Conference Board of the Mathematical Sciences (CBMS) 1992 Conference on Hopf Algebras. Her CBMS monograph Hopf Algebras and their Actions on Rings is highly cited. She has written one other book and has edited five collections of research articles.

She served as an editor for the Journal of Algebra for over 20 years. She was also an editor for the AMS Proceedings, AMS Mathematical Surveys and Monographs, and Advances in Mathematics, and currently is on the editorial boards of Algebras and Representation Theory and of Algebra and Number Theory.

Montgomery has been very active in the American Mathematical Society, serving on the Board of Trustees from 1986–1996. She has also served on the Council, the Policy Committee on Publications, and on the Nominating Committee.

In 2013 she was elected to a 3-year term as a Vice-President of the American Mathematical Society. She was also a member of the National Research Council's Board on Mathematical Sciences and Their Applications (BMSA), serving one year on the Executive Committee.

In 2012 she was selected a Fellow of the American Mathematical Society and a Fellow of the AAAS.
