= Israel Nathan Herstein =

Polish-American mathematician (1923–1988)

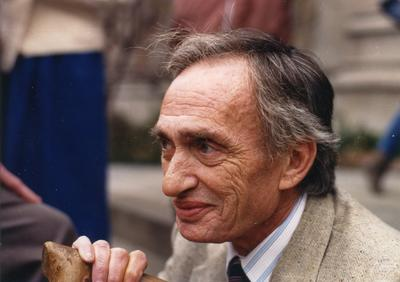
- Herstein in Berkeley, California, 1987
- Born: March 28, 1923; Lublin, Poland
- Died: February 9, 1988 (aged 64); Chicago, Illinois, USA
- Education: University of Manitoba; Indiana University Bloomington
- Known for: Abstract algebra, Mixture-space theorem
- Scientific career
- Fields: Mathematics
- Institutions: University of Pennsylvania; Cornell University; University of Chicago
- Doctoral advisor: Max Zorn
- Doctoral students: Susan Montgomery; Claudio Procesi; Wallace Smith Martindale

Israel Nathan Herstein (March 28, 1923 – February 9, 1988) was a mathematician, appointed as professor at the University of Chicago in 1962. He worked on a variety of areas of algebra, including ring theory, with over 100 research papers and over a dozen books.

== Education and career ==
Herstein was born in Lublin, Poland, in 1923. His family emigrated to Winnipeg in 1926, and he grew up in a harsh and underprivileged environment where, according to him, "you either became a gangster or a college professor." During his school years he played football, ice hockey, golf, tennis, and pool. He also worked as a steeplejack and as a barker at a fair. He received his B.S. degree from the University of Manitoba and his M.A. from the University of Toronto. He received his Ph.D. from Indiana University Bloomington in 1948. His advisor was Max Zorn. He held positions at the University of Kansas, Ohio State University, University of Pennsylvania, and Cornell University before permanently settling at the University of Chicago in 1962. He was a Guggenheim Fellow for the academic year 1960–1961.

He is known for his lucid style of writing, as exemplified by his Topics in Algebra, an undergraduate introduction to abstract algebra that was first published in 1964, with a second edition in 1975. A more advanced text is his Noncommutative Rings in the Carus Mathematical Monographs series. His primary interest was in noncommutative ring theory, but he also wrote papers on finite groups, linear algebra, and mathematical economics.

He had 30 Ph.D. students, traveled and lectured widely, and spoke Italian, Hebrew, Polish, and Portuguese. He died from cancer in Chicago, Illinois, in 1988. His doctoral students include Miriam Cohen, Wallace S. Martindale, Susan Montgomery, Karen Parshall and Claudio Procesi.

== Selected publications ==
- Herstein, I. N. (May 1954). "On the Lie ring of a simple ring". Proc Natl Acad Sci U S A. 40 (5): 305–306. Bibcode:1954PNAS...40..305H. doi:10.1073/pnas.40.5.305. PMC 534126. PMID 16589478.
- Herstein, I. N. (October 1965). "A counterexample in Noetherian rings". Proc Natl Acad Sci U S A. 54 (4): 1036–1037. Bibcode:1965PNAS...54.1036H. doi:10.1073/pnas.54.4.1036. PMC 219788. PMID 16578617.
- Topics in Algebra. Milton Keynes: John Wiley & Sons. 1991 [1964]. ISBN 978-0-471-01090-6.
- Rings with Involution. Chicago: Univ. of Chicago Press. 1976. ISBN 978-0-226-32806-5.
- Noncommutative Rings. Washington: American Mathematical Soc. 1994 [1968]. ISBN 978-0-88385-015-2.
