= Mary Murdoch =

Physician and suffragist

Mary Charlotte Murdoch
- Mary Murdoch at work
- Born: 26 September 1864; Elgin, Scotland
- Died: 20 March 1916 (aged 51); Kingston upon Hull, England
- Education: London School of Medicine for Women
- Known for: First female doctor in Hull

Mary Charlotte Murdoch (26 September 1864 – 20 March 1916) was a Scottish physician and suffragist. She had a lifelong association with Kingston upon Hull, where she was the first woman doctor, a suffragist, and car owner.

== Early life and education ==
Murdoch was born on 26 September 1864 in Elgin, Scotland, the youngest child of Jane (née Macdonald) and William Murdoch. Her father was a solicitor. She was educated by governesses before attending Weston House School, Elgin. She subsequently attended Manor Mount Girls' Collegiate School in London, after which she received tuition in Lausanne, Switzerland.

She returned to Elgin to care for her widowed and invalided mother, who died in 1887. Around this time she discovered what she regarded as the "love of her life", medicine. Her ambition was encouraged by the family doctor, Dr Adams. She studied to be a doctor at the London School of Medicine for Women, funded by money that her mother had left her. While at the school she was curator of its museum. She studied a midwifery course at the Maternity Hospital, Brighton, completed her studies in Scotland and formally qualified in 1892.

== Career ==
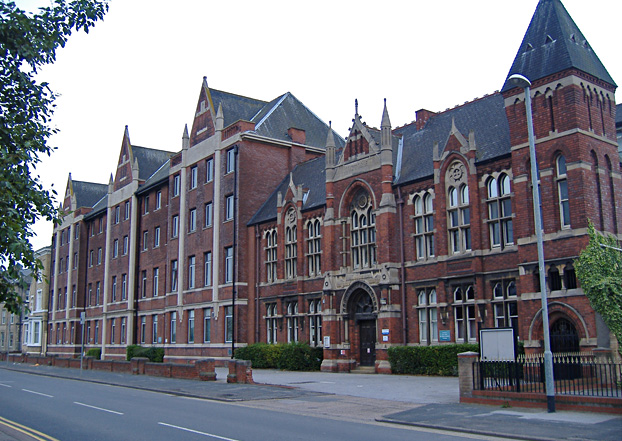
What was Victoria Hospital for Sick Children in Park Street, Hull

In 1893 she began her association with Hull when she became a house surgeon at the Victoria Hospital for Sick Children, which had opened two years previously, in Park Street. In 1894 she joined the British Medical Association and she was also a member of the Association of Registered Medical Women. She moved to work at Tottenham Fever Hospital in London in 1895. Illness followed and the following year she was back in Hull as the city's first female general practitioner.

In 1900 she employed as an assistant, the newly qualified doctor Louisa Martindale. They worked closely together not just as partners in their business. In 1902 they went on a cycling holiday together, visiting Vienna, Berlin and Switzerland. They were in partnership until 1906. When she wrote her biography, Martindale spent a chapter on their life together.

== Suffrage ==
Murdoch founded the Hull Women's Suffrage Society in 1904, as a branch of the Millicent Fawcett's National Union of Women's Suffrage Societies (NUWSS), but fell out with the group after the national body decided to not support militant methods by any campaigner. Murdoch then joined the Women's Social and Political Union (WSPU) who had increasingly militant methods. She was still well regarded by Fawcett, they remained friends, and in 1911 she was chosen as Fawcett's representative at the International Council of Women in Stockholm.

== Personal life ==
She was the first woman in Hull to own a car, which she drove at speed. One anecdote describes how six men had to put her car back on the road after she had rolled backwards down a hill and her car had caught fire. Murdoch then joked about it with her passenger.

Murdoch joined the Church of England in 1914. Murdoch died at her home in Hull in 1916 after returning through snow from seeing an emergency patient. Her funeral procession, which attracted thousands of mourners, was led by her car. She was cremated and her urn was placed in the Lady Chapel of All Saints church in Hull. Plaques were placed on her home in Park Street and on the former Victoria Hospital.

== Legacy ==
Murdoch's career is also the subject of a 1919 biography: A woman doctor: Mary Murdoch of Hull by Hope Malleson. The appendix to this book quotes Murdoch from an address she gave to students of the London School of Medicine for Women in 1904 that she dreamt of a future in which it would be seen as 'one of the barbarisms of a past age that a medical man should ever have attended a woman'.

In March 2021, a new footbridge was opened connecting Hull city to Princes Quay waterfront, marina and fruit market over Castle Street, a dual carriageway road also designated A63. The name Murdoch's Connection was nominated by pupils from Newland School for Girls in Newland, Hull.
