= Louisa Martindale =

English physician, surgeon and writer (1872–1966)

Louisa Martindale CBE FRCOG
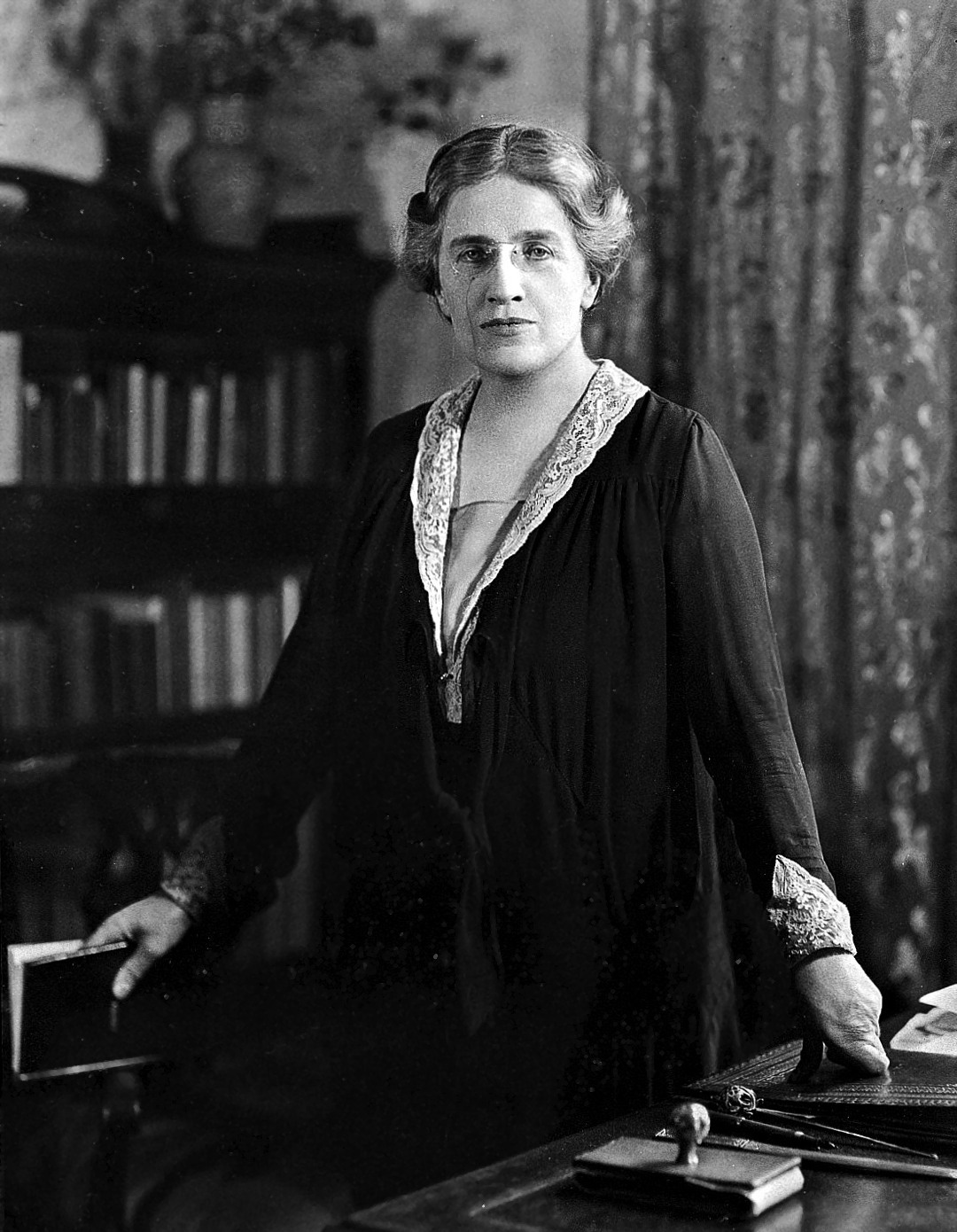
- Born: 30 October 1872; Leytonstone, Essex, England
- Died: 5 February 1966 (aged 93); London, England
- Education: Brighton High School for Girls
- Alma mater: Royal Holloway, University of London, London School of Medicine for Women
- Occupations: Surgeon; physician; writer
- Employer(s): Lewes Road Dispensary for Women and Children, New Sussex Hospital
- Organization(s): Brighton Women's Franchise Society, Scottish Women's Hospitals, National Council of Women
- Notable work: Under the Surface (1909); A Woman Surgeon (1951)
- Children: Hilda Martindale
- Mother: Louisa Martindale
- Relatives: Albert Spicer (grandfather); Lancelot Spicer (uncle)

Louisa Martindale CBE FRCOG (30 October 1872 – 5 February 1966) was an English physician, surgeon and writer. She also served as magistrate on the Brighton bench, was a prison commissioner and a member of the National Council of Women. She served with the Scottish Women's Hospitals at Royaumont Abbey in France in World War I, and as a surgeon in London in World War II. Through her writings she promoted medicine as a career for women.

== Early life ==
Louisa Martindale was born in Leytonstone, Essex, the first child of William Martindale (c. 1832–1874) and his second wife Louisa (née Spicer). The family had a Congregational Church background.Her mother, "a champion of a larger life for women", was an active suffragist and a member of the Women's Liberal Federation, and of the executive committee of the National Union of Women's Suffrage Societies (NUWSS). In the 1880s, Mrs. Martindale held open house for Brighton shop girls on a regular basis, and young Louisa grew up in an environment supportive of her future career.

After the death of William Martindale the family moved to Cornwall, and thence to Germany and Switzerland, finally returning to England to live in Lewes, East Sussex. In 1885, the family moved again, this time to Brighton so that Louisa and her sister Hilda could attend Brighton High School for Girls (now Brighton Girls).

From an early age it had been decided that Louisa should become a doctor, and at 17 she was sent to Royal Holloway, University of London in Egham and obtained her London Matriculation in 1892. She then entered the London School of Medicine for Women in 1893, gaining her MB in 1899, and her BS. In 1900, she went north to Hull as an assistant to Dr. Mary Murdoch, the beginning of her professional life. Murdoch and Martindale worked closely as they were partners in their business. In 1902, they went on a cycling holiday together visiting Vienna, Berlin and Switzerland. They were in partnership until 1906.

== Career ==
After five years in Hull, in 1906 Martindale gained her Doctor of Medicine and returned to Brighton. She started her own general practice and very soon was asked to join the Lewes Road Dispensary for Women and Children (which in 1911 became the Lady Chichester Hospital, Brighton Branch) as a visiting medical officer.

She served with the Scottish Women's Hospitals at Royaumont Abbey in France in World War I, and as a surgeon in London in World War II.

In 1920, she was instrumental in the setting up of the New Sussex Hospital for Women in Windlesham Road, Brighton, and held the post of senior surgeon and physician there until 1937.

After moving to London as a consultant surgeon, Martindale soon became known as honorary surgeon at the Marie Curie Hospital. In 1931, Martindale was elected president of the Medical Women's Federation. She was appointed CBE that same year. Two years later, she was elected a Fellow of the Royal College of Obstetricians and Gynaecologists. In 1937, Martindale was appointed to the council of the Royal College of Obstetricians and Gynaecologists as its first woman member.

Martindale's medical interests were sometimes controversial, especially her studies of venereal disease and prostitution. Her book Under the Surface (1909), in which she spoke quite openly about these very topics, apparently caused a stir in the House of Commons. She also laid the groundwork for research in the treatment of uterine cancer and fibroid growths in women by means of intensive X-ray therapy.

She secured a long and distinguished life and career in medicine, carrying out over 7000 operations. Her work brought her respect and acknowledgment from both her colleagues and her patients: she was made a Fellow of the Royal College of Obstetricians in 1933, and was a member of the Royal Society of Medicine. Eventually she became a specialist in the early treatment of cervical cancer by X-ray and she later lectured extensively throughout the UK, the United States, and Germany.

== Activism ==
An active member of the Brighton Women's Franchise Society, she also served as a magistrate for many years on the Brighton bench, became president of the Medical Women's Federation in 1931, was a Prison Commissioner and a member of the National Council of Women.

== Personal life ==
Martindale never married and lived for more than three decades with another woman, Ismay FitzGerald (c. 1875–1946), daughter of Baron FitzGerald of Kilmarnock. Some scholars are wary of identifying Martindale as a lesbian. Geoffrey Walford, for instance, does not state whether Martindale's "woman-centred lifestyle" specifically entailed a lesbian relationship. Others are more explicit and unhesitatingly propose Martindale's lesbianism, referring for instance to her 1951 autobiography A Woman Surgeon, in which she writes quite openly and tenderly (though without giving explicit detail) about her love for FitzGerald.

== Death ==
Martindale retired from practice in 1947. She died in her home in London on 5 February 1966, aged 93.

== Legacy ==
In June 2023, the Royal Sussex County Hospital in Brighton opened a new £500 million, 11-storey building named in honour of Martindale.

== Works by Louisa Martindale ==
- Under the Surface. Brighton: Southern Publishing Company, 1909.
- The Treatment of Thirty-Seven Cases of Uterine Fibromyomata by Intensive X-Ray Therapy. 1920.
- The Woman Doctor and Her Future. London: Mills and Boon, 1922. Available online at Internet Archives.
- Menorrhagia Treated by Intensive X-Ray Therapy. 1923.
- Treatment of Cancer of the Breast. 1945.
- The Artificial Menopause. 1945.
- The Prevention of Venereal Disease. London: Research Books, 1945.
- Venereal Disease, Its Influence on the Health of the Nation, Its Cure and Prevention. 1948.
- A Woman Surgeon. London: Gollancz, 1951.

== Sources ==
- Brown, Val. Women's Hospitals in Brighton and Hove. Hastings: Hastings Press, 2006.
- Delamont, Sara. "Martindale, Louisa (1872–1966)". Oxford Dictionary of National Biography. Oxford: Oxford UP, 2004.
- LSMW Archive material at the Royal Free Hospital Archive.
- Martindale, Hilda. From One Generation to Another: A Book of Memoirs, 1839-1944. London: George Allen & Unwin, 1944.
- Wojtczak, Helena. Notable Sussex Women. Hastings: Hastings Press, 2008.
