= Louisa Martindale (feminist) =

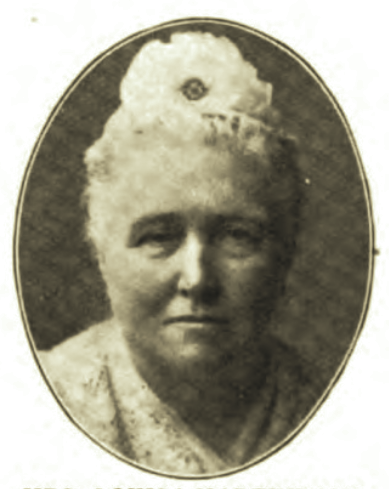
Louisa Spicer Martinsdale

Louisa Martindale, née Spicer (25 June 1839 – 15 March 1914) was a British activist for women's rights and suffragist.

== Life ==
Martindale was born in Woodford Green, Essex. Her father, James Spicer, was a wholesale stationer with a successful family business. The family were prominent Congregationalists.

She founded the Ray Lodge Mission Station in Woodford Green in 1865. During her time in Brighton, she was one of the founders of the Women's Liberal Association (1891), Women's Co-operative Movement and a women's dispensary that later became the New Sussex Hospital for Women and Children. She was also involved with the British and Foreign Bible Society and the Women's Suffrage Society. She assisted her brother, Albert Spicer, a Liberal MP for the Monmouth Boroughs (1892–1900) and Hackney Central (1906–18), who himself worked on issues such as the admission of women into county councils.

Her interest in women's rights dated from 1867. She spoke in Spicer's Monmouth constituency on issues such as the aforementioned admission of women into county councils, wrote lectures on the rights of women and related topics, and supported women's right to preach. In 1904, she attended (with her daughter Hilda) the International Congress of Women in Berlin, where she met Susan B. Anthony; she was a member of the executive committee of the National Union of Women's Suffrage Societies, and a vice-president of the Central Society. Not just content with political action, Martindale engaged in a practical manner to improve the situation of women. In the 1880s, she opened her house for shop girls on alternate Saturdays, and took a number of underprivileged young women under her wing, among whom was Margaret Bondfield, later the first female Cabinet member of the United Kingdom.

== Personal life ==
In 1871, she married William Martindale, who was a merchant. Their marriage was short-lived; he died only a few years later. One of their children was Louisa who was a suffragist and surgeon. Another was Hilda, a civil servant and author. A third daughter died in infancy. After her husband's death in around 1874, Louisa travelled with her young daughters around England and Europe, eventually settling in Brighton. In 1903, she moved to Horsted Keynes in Sussex, where she built a Congregational church.

== Death ==
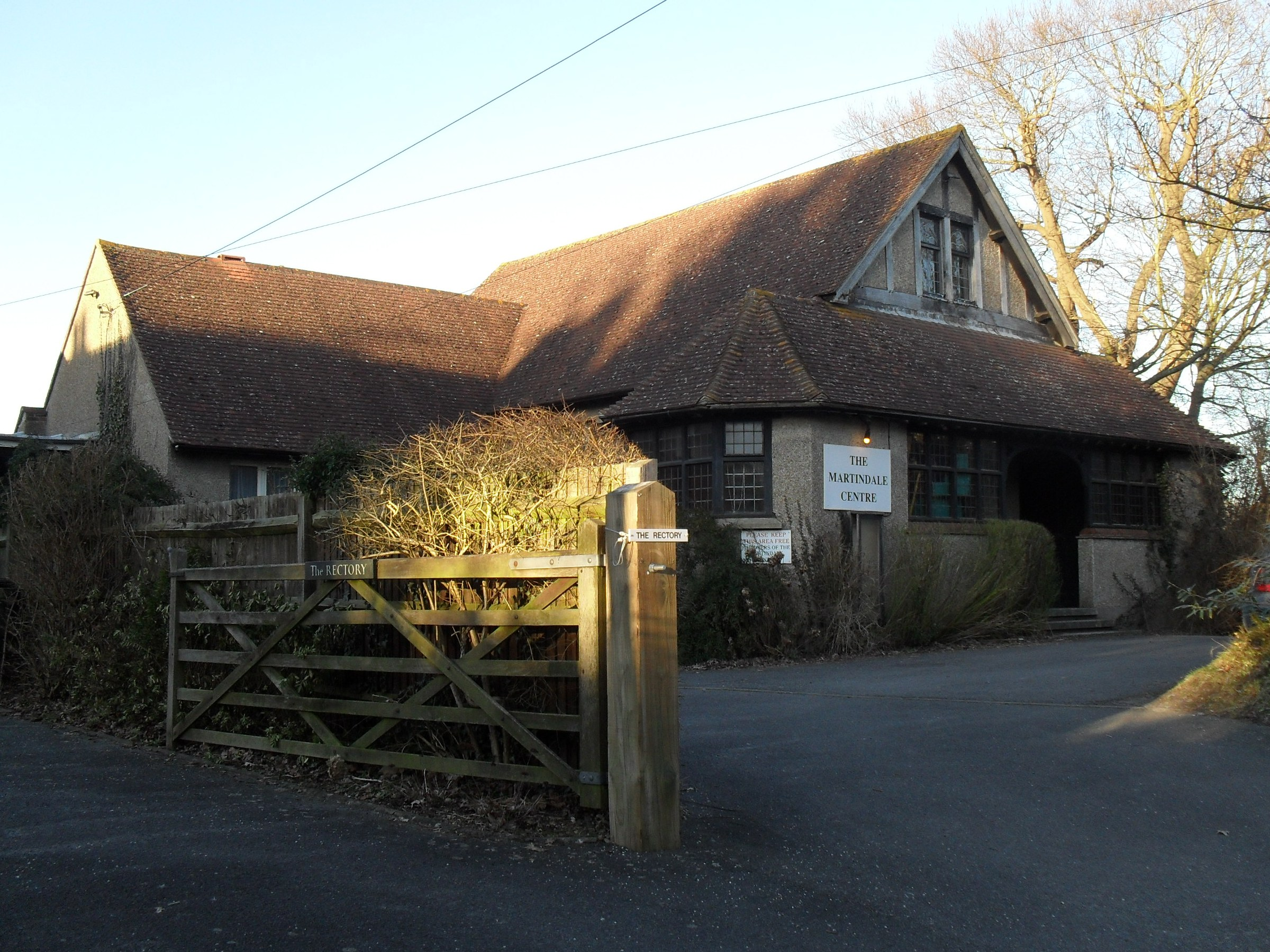
The Martindale Centre in Horsted Keynes, West Sussex, was founded in 1907 by Louisa Martindale as a Congregational church.

Martindale died from pneumonia in Horsted Keynes on 15 March 1914, aged 74.

== Legacy ==
Louisa Martindale's legacy is by now well-recognised. The history of her work in Horsted Keynes, as a founder of the Congregationalist "Free Church" there, as a community leader, and as an advocate of women's religious rights, is maintained in the Martindale Centre, in the heart of the village.

Perhaps her legacy is best symbolized by her brother James Spicer's great-granddaughter, Harriet Harman QC MP, a Labour politician who has attained high-ranking functions such as Deputy Leader, and Party Chair of the Labour Party, Leader of the House of Commons, Lord Privy Seal, and Minister for Women and Equality.
