= Ken Martindale =

British car salesman and businessman

- Born: William Kenneth Martindale; June 28, 1932
- Died: September 10, 2015 (aged 83)
- Occupations: Car salesman, businessman

William Kenneth Martindale (28 June 1932 – 10 September 2015) was a British businessman, and the managing director and chairman of Lookers, who expanded the Manchester-based car dealership from four to 84 outlets.

Martindale was chairman of the Institute of the Motor Industry and the National Franchised Dealers Association, president of the Retail Motor Industry Federation, and a trustee of the Motor Industry Pension Plan.
