= Martindale (unit) =

Measure of textile abrasion resistance

The Martindale is a unit for quantifying the abrasion resistance of textiles, especially when used for upholstery.

The Martindale method, also known as the Martindale rub test, simulates natural wear of a seat cover, in which the textile sample is rubbed against a standard abrasive surface with a specified force. It has been invented in the beginning of the 20th century by the English dyer and colorist Martindale and it's the most commonly used method for testing the abrasion resistance of textiles.

The test equipment works in intervals of 5000 cycles, totalling the wear number (unit: Martindale) of abrasion cycles that leads to the material being worn to a specified degree. The higher the value, the more resistant the material is to abrasion.

The national German textile institute specifies a minimum requirement for various applications, and here are some examples:

| | Soft padding [Martindale] | Hard padding [Martindale] |
|---|---|---|
| Private use | 10,000 | 15,000 |
| Office use | 25,000 | 35,000 |
| For public transportation | 30,000 | 40,000 |

Material for use by police or emergency services may require values of 200,000 to 500,000.

In the US, the Wyzenbeek test is often used instead of the Martindale.

The Martindale machine also tests for fabric pilling.
