= Whitewater Valley =

English Site of Special Scientific Interest

Coordinates: 52.620°N 0.461°W

- Site of Special Scientific Interest
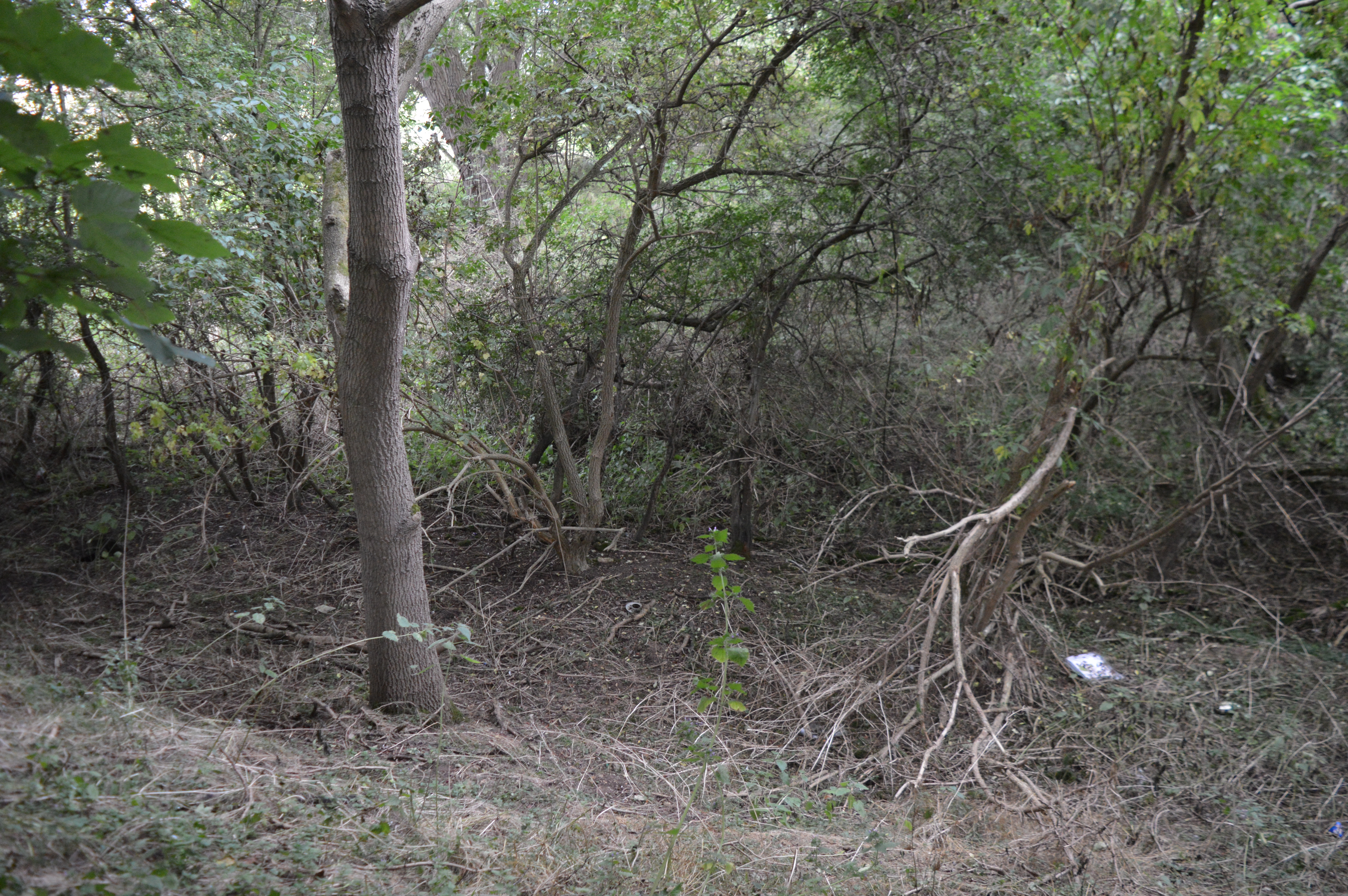
- Location of Whitewater Valley.
- Area of search: Cambridgeshire
- Grid reference: TF 043 036
- Interest: Biological
- Area: 4.3 hectares
- Notification date: 1987
- Location map: Magic Map

Whitewater Valley is a 4.3-hectare (11-acre) biological Site of Special Scientific Interest north-west of Wittering in Cambridgeshire.

Habitats in this site include a stream together with associated marsh, tall fen and willow carr. The carr has a varied flora, and the marsh has many plants rare in the county. There are also springs, which have mosses including the uncommon cratoneuron commutatum.

The site is private land with no public access.
