= Hilda Martindale =

British civil servant and author (1875–1952)

Hilda Martindale CBE
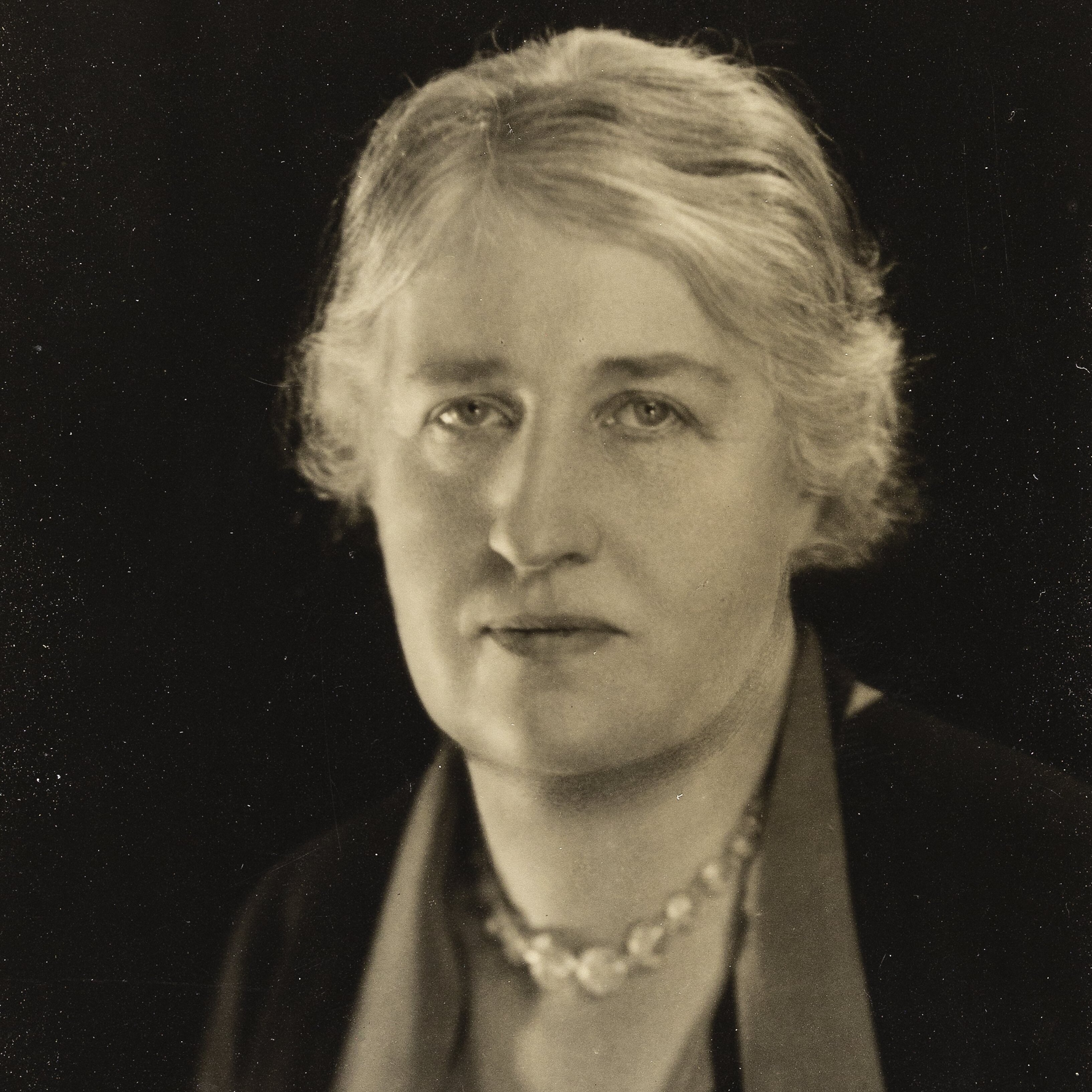
- Born: 12 March 1875; Leytonstone, England
- Died: April 18, 1952 (aged 77); South Kensington, London
- Occupations: Civil servant, author
- Mother: Louisa Martindale

Hilda Martindale CBE (12 March 1875 – 18 April 1952) was a British civil servant and author, and the daughter of Louisa Martindale. She was a prominent campaigner for the improvement of working conditions, particularly those of women. Her will established the Hilda Martindale Trust in 1952 to fund British women attempting to establish themselves in professions dominated by men.

== Early life and education ==
Hilda Martindale was born on 12 March 1875 in Leytonstone. Her mother was Louisa Martindale, née Spicer, a British activist for women's rights and suffragist. Her father was William Martindale, a City merchant who died before she was born. Her elder sister Dr. Louisa Martindale (named after their mother) was a leading surgeon.

She was taught initially by governesses in Switzerland and Germany before attending Brighton High School for Girls (now Brighton Girls). She would go on to study at Royal Holloway College and later at Bedford College. During 1900-1901 she traveled around the world studying how children were treated.

== Career and activism ==
In 1901, she became a factory inspector with the Home Office. She was one of Britain's first female factory inspectors. In 1903 she wrote an important report about lead poisoning in brickworks. In 1904 she and her mother attended the International Congress of Women in Berlin. By 1914, she had become a Senior Lady Inspector. In 1918, she was a recipient of one of the 1918 Birthday Honours; specifically, she was made an Officer of the Order of the British Empire (OBE). She became a Commander of the same Order (CBE) in the 1935 Birthday Honours.

In 1925, she became Deputy Chief Inspector of Factories. In 1933, she joined the Treasury, and she retired at age 65 in 1937. She had been one of the first women to reach the higher levels of the Civil Service. She was a member of the Whitley Council Committee on the Women's Question, and as such she argued in favour of women's right to choose whether or not to leave their jobs if they got married, as well as in favour of equal pay.

After retiring, she wrote books including A History of Women in the Civil Service, One Generation to Another (about her family), Some Victorian Portraits, and Women Servants of the State: 1870-1938.

== Death and legacy ==
Martindale died on 18 April 1952, aged 77, in Coleherne Court, South Kensington, London.

In her will she appointed Bedford College as trustees of the Hilda Martindale Trust, which "makes a very limited number of awards to British women towards training or studying for a career in a profession where women are underrepresented. The maximum award is £3,000."
