= James B. Martindale =

American lawyer

James Martindale
- Born: March 30, 1836; Henry County, Indiana, U.S.
- Died: May 17, 1904 (aged 68); Brooklyn, New York, U.S.
- Other names: J.B. Martindale
- Occupation: Attorney
- Known for: Founder of Martindale-Hubbell
- Father: Elijah Martindale

James B. Martindale (March 30, 1836 – May 17, 1904) was an American attorney and a founder of the Martindale-Hubbell Law Directory, the noted legal reference and catalog of lawyers that has since become Martindale-Hubbell, an information services company.

== Biography ==
Martindale was born on his family's farm in Henry County, Indiana, the son of pioneer and judge Elijah Martindale. He studied law and was admitted to the bar, later establishing his own law firm Martindale Law and Collection Agency in Indianapolis, which he later moved to Chicago. He led the New York City branch office of the firm.

He published the first issue of Martindale's Directory in 1868.

After the early death of his wife, James Martindale was left to raise his two sons, who later became his business partners. He also wrote poetry, often devoted to rural and peaceful home surroundings among familiar scenes and friends.

Martindale died at the age of 68 in Brooklyn, New York, and his son, George, took over his law practice and publishing business.

== Sources and External Links ==
- Biography
- LexisNexis Martindale-Hubbell official history
