= Maureen Muggeridge =

Maureen Tatiana Muggeridge (13 August 1948 – 7 October 2010) was a British geologist best known for discovering the Argyle diamond deposit in the north of Western Australia.

== Early life and education ==
Maureen Tatiana Muggeridge was born in Croydon, England. Her father was Eric Muggeridge, the founder of the charity Plan International. Muggeridge spent the majority of her childhood in Cameroon and was later sent back to England to a convent school in Sussex. Later, she became a day pupil at Brighton and Hove High School.

== Career ==
After graduating in Geology from the University of St Andrews, she moved to Perth, Western Australia, with support from her family. Within a week, she got a job with a mining company called Tanganyika Holdings and was flying over the Outback searching for diamonds. Tanganyika Holdings was involved in a joint venture with other companies.

In 1976, minerals were found which suggested the presence of diamonds. A joint venture was set up with CRA Exploration which they called the Ashton Joint Venture. This was masterminded by Rees Towie, managing director of Northern Mining. In 1979, Muggeridge married Towie's son John. She became pregnant and discovered diamond samples in the flood plains surrounding Smoke Creek, a small stream in East Kimberley that drained into Lake Argyle. At the time, word had got out that there might be diamonds and rival exploration teams were in the area. To put them off the scent, CRA rumoured that Muggeridge had gone on maternity leave while, in fact, she was tracing the source of the diamonds to the headwaters of Smoke Creek and pegging out the boundaries of her claim. This turned out to be the world's largest known diamond deposit, larger than all the rest put together. Today, these diamonds are among the world's rarest gems and the mine produces one-third of global output.

Muggeridge received international recognition for papers on the applications of explosion-sampling techniques. She directed exploration for Moonstone Diamond Corporation in Perth and then set up her own Paramount Mining Corporation in 2002. It was floated on the Australian Stock Exchange in 2004.

She died of a stroke while sampling for diamonds at Napier Downs, in a remote part of Western Australia.
