= Hattie Martindale =

Source of "Veiled Lady of Kirtland" story

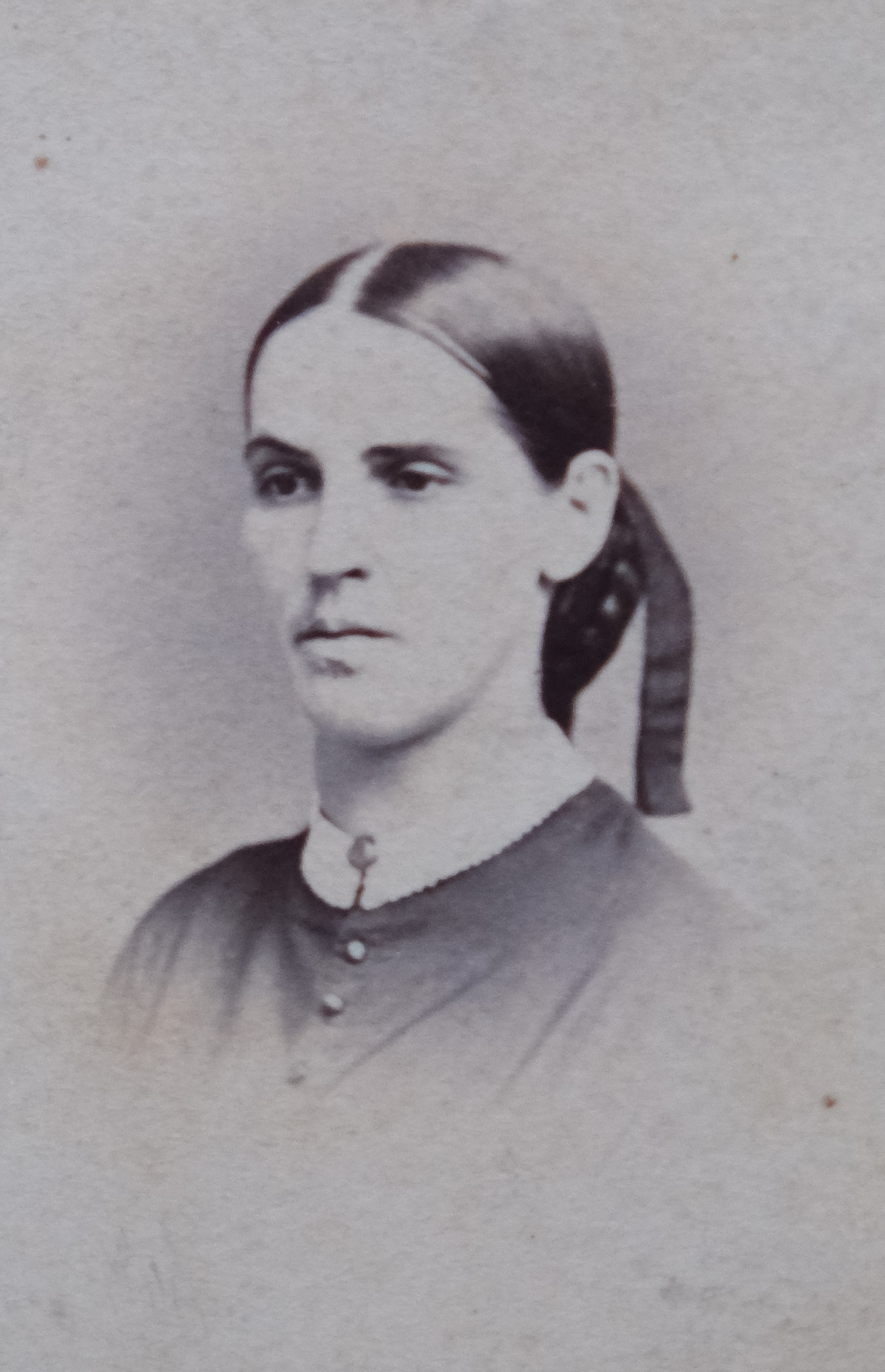
- A portrait of Hattie Martindale, circa 1861
- Born: August 7, 1838; Kirtland Ohio
- Died: September 12, 1919 (aged 81)
- Resting place: Kirtland North Historic Cemetery
- Education: Oberlin College

Harriet "Hattie" Martindale (August 7, 1838 – September 12, 1919) lived in Kirtland, Ohio. She is best known for becoming an involuntary celebrity when local rumors about her became the subject of international papers several times in the 1910s. Due to these stories, she became known as the "Veiled Lady of Kirtland." After her death, she became the subject of a ghost story that persisted for a century.

== Life ==
Martindale was born on August 7, 1838, in Kirtland, Ohio, to Timothy Dwight Martindale and Harriet Gunn. Timothy was a prominent farmer from Massachusetts, who was a leader of the effort to discredit Joseph Smith when the Mormons chose Kirtland as their first headquarters. Hattie attended Oberlin College from 1861 to 1862 and graduated with a diploma on the Literary Course. During her studies at Oberlin, she had an episode of a chronic eye disorder that she suffered from for the rest of her life. After graduation, she sought treatment for her eyes by spending several months at the Cleveland Water Cure Establishment, a hydrotherapy facility in Cleveland. On March 9, 1864, she was bridesmaid for her sister Lucy Martindale at Lucy's marriage to Thomas Milton Morley, a Second lieutenant in the 25th Ohio Independent Light Artillery Battery during the American Civil War.

In the 1880 census, Martindale was marked "insane", with a census supplement noting a diagnosis of Mania. At some point in the 1880s, she was a patient at the Newburgh Hospital for the Insane, later known as the Cleveland State Hospital.

Martindale lived in Kirtland for the remainder of her life, and died September 12, 1919. She was buried in Kirtland's Historic North Cemetery.

== Veiled Lady of Kirtland ==
On July 7, 1909, the Cleveland Plain-Dealer published a multi-page spread in its magazine section titled "The Veiled Lady of Kirtland". This article reported a number of local rumors about Martindale. It alleged that she "had worn a heavy veil for more than forty years" and that this was "based on a love affair and a resolution that no man again should see her face." It also reported a story told by the Kirtland Postmaster, who alleged that she started wearing the veil after going for a midnight ride to be alone. It also alleged that the main character of the novel "The Spinner in the Sun" by Myrtle Reed was based on Martindale.

This story was syndicated to the New York World newspaper, which syndicated it to newspapers in the United States, Australia and New Zealand in 1910–11. In 1916–17, the story of the "Veiled Lady" again circulated in over fifty newspapers in the United States. During this time, an additional element was added to the story:

When a young woman Miss Martindale was engaged to marry a man a few years her senior. One night when walking alone a country road near her home, she saw her sister in the arms of her fiance. Three weeks later the man she was to have wed became the husband of her sister. Heartbroken, she solemnly vowed no man should see her face again, and through the use of a heavy veil and a life of seclusion she has kept her word.

In 1940, another version of the "Veiled Lady" story was published in the Cleveland Plain-Dealer by Grace Goulder Izant. This version added alleged details about Martindale's supposed wedding dress. In 1959, Martindale's great-nephew, J. Morley Nutting, wrote to Goulder asking her to help him stop these rumors, and indicating that the reason his grandaunt wore a veil was because of a treatment for an ongoing debilitating eye disorder.

=== Debunking the myth ===
The Plain Dealer published versions of this story again in 1970 and 2000. Additionally, Martindale's story was reinterpreted as the subject of a local ghost story by local paranormal enthusiasts, who allege that she haunted the Kirtland North Cemetery and houses nearby. In October 2022, Belt Magazine published an article debunking the "Veiled Lady of Kirtland" myth, and The Plain Dealer ran "A correction 113 years in the making" to its previous reporting of the story.
