= Martindale-Hubbell =

American legal information services company

- Parent company: Internet Brands
- Founded: 1868
- Founder: James B. Martindale
- Country of origin: United States
- Headquarters location: New Providence, New Jersey
- Nonfiction topics: Law
- Official website: martindale.com

Martindale-Hubbell is an American information services company to the legal profession that was founded in 1868. The company publishes the Martindale-Hubbell Law Directory, which provides background information on lawyers and law firms in the United States and other countries. It also published the Martindale Hubbell Law Digest, a summary of laws around the world. Martindale-Hubbell is owned by consumer website company Internet Brands.

== History ==
=== 19th century ===
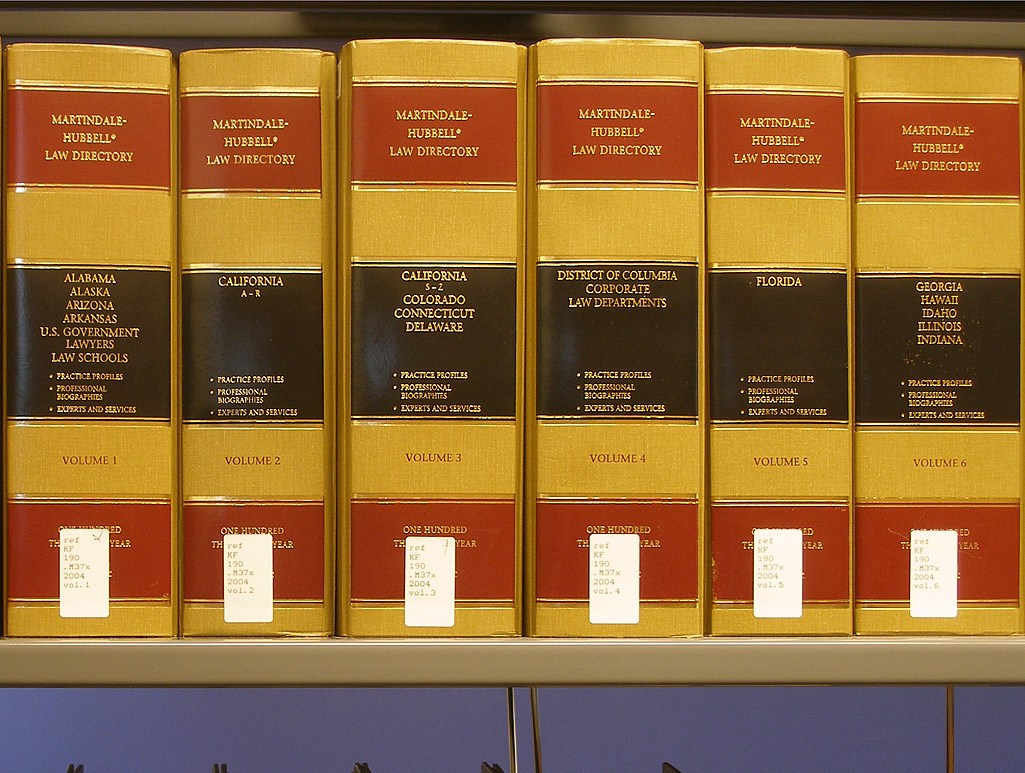
Volumes of the 2004 edition of Martindale-Hubbell Law Directory on the shelf in the reference section of the Dr. Martin Luther King Jr. Library in San Jose, California

Martindale's Directory was first published in 1868 by James B. Martindale, a lawyer and business person. He wrote in the preface:

The object of the work is to furnish to Lawyers, Bankers, Wholesale Merchants, Manufacturers, Real Estate Agents, and all others who may have need of business correspondents away from home, the address of one reliable law firm, one reliable bank, and one reliable real estate agent in each city and town in the United States; also to give the laws of the several States on subjects of a commercial character that are of interest or importance to business men, or have a bearing on mercantile transactions and the collection of debts....

The first edition of Hubbell's Legal Directory was published in 1870. By 1896, Martindale's Directory included basic information that still appears in today's Martindale-Hubbell Directory. This edition introduced law digests for all the states and provinces. The same year, the 26th edition of the Hubbell's Legal Directory was published.

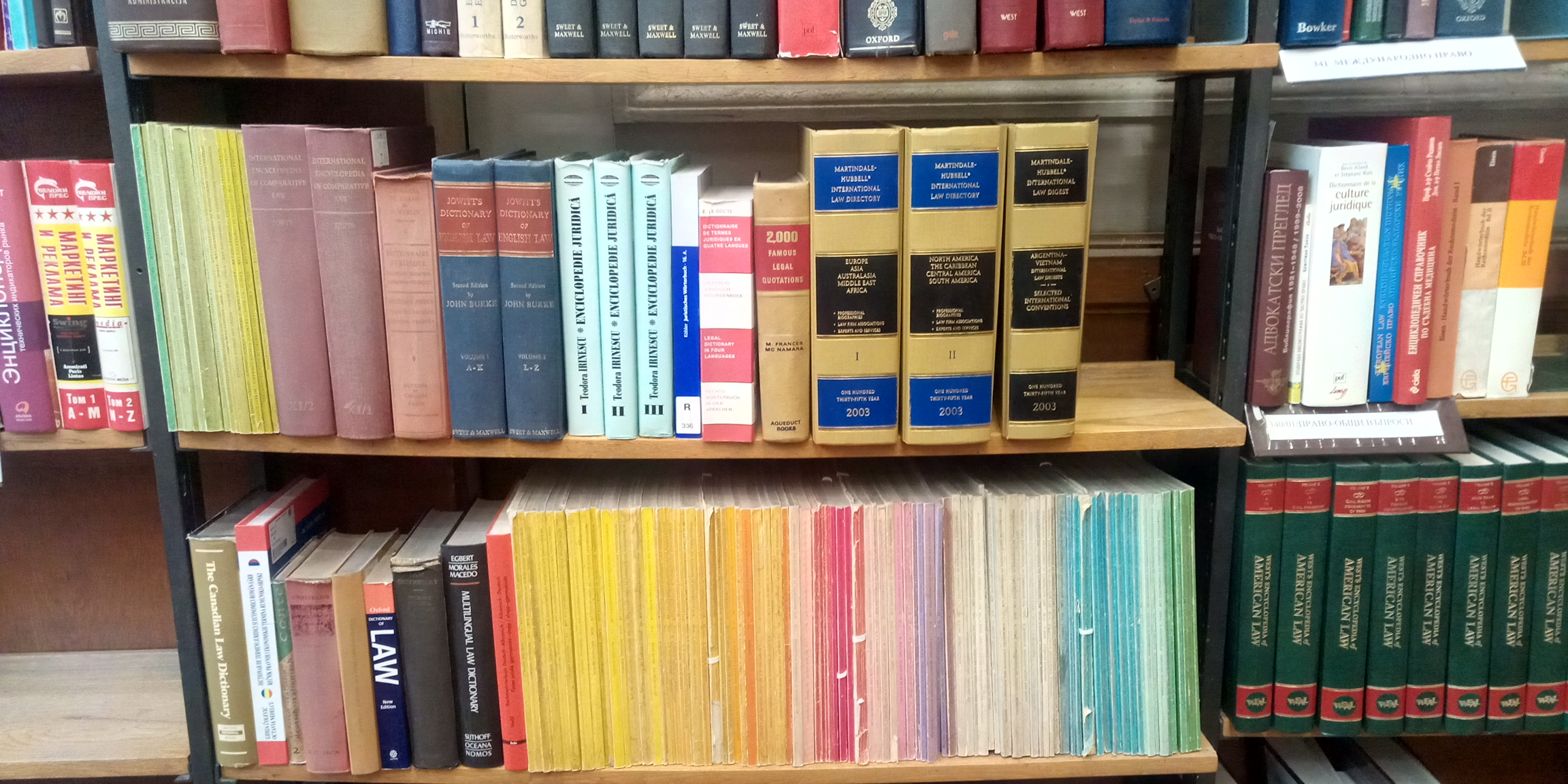
The volumes of the 2003 edition of the Martindale Hubbell International Law Directory and International Law Digest above the volumes of the de: International Encyclopedia of Comparative Law on the shelves in the reference section of the National Library "Sts. Cyril and Methodius" in Sofia, Bulgaria

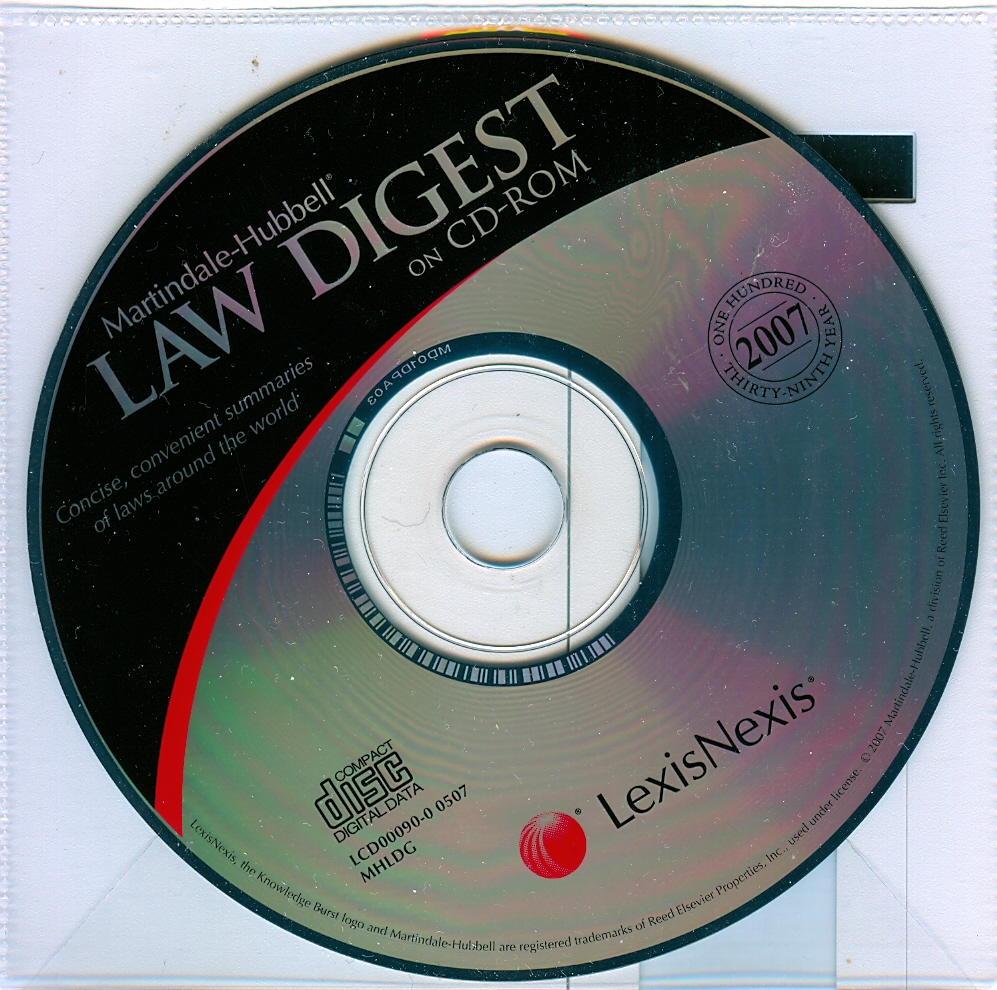
2007 Edition of LexisNexis Martindale-Hubbell Law Digest on CD-ROM

=== 20th century ===
By combining the Martindale's Directory and Hubbell's Legal Directory, the first edition of the Martindale-Hubbell Law Directory was published in 1931 as a two-volume set.

In 1951, a digest was added for Israel. Meanwhile, internal conditions as well as difficulties of communication with Bulgaria, Czechoslovakia, Hungary, Poland and Romania had made it necessary to withdraw publication of law digests for these countries. These law digests were revised and again published in the 1990s. Throughout the years Martindale Hubbell Law Digest, which was revised and published annually, has been considered as an incomplete encyclopaedia of comparative law in English.

In 1990, Martindale-Hubbell was purchased by Reed International P.L.C. Reed Elsevier came into being in 1992, following the merger of Reed International, a British trade book and magazine publisher, and Elsevier, the Netherlands-based scientific publisher.

=== 21st century ===
Their directory went online in 2004, "free to legal professionals." In 2007, the LexisNexis Martindale-Hubbell Law Digest became available only via CD-ROM and subscription on-line. In 2009, all the 150 Law Digests could be consulted free of charge on martindale.com. In October 2013, Reed Elsevier entered into a joint venture with Internet Brands, LLC. In March 2014, the joint venture was completed resulting in the combination of Martindale-Hubbell, Lawyers.com, and Internet Brand's Nolo legal division. The joint venture operates under the name of Martindale-Hubbell.

== Products and services ==
- Lawyers.com and martindale.com began offering free, online legal assistance to the public in June 1998, and has more than one million lawyers and law firms worldwide in its database. The site contains a database of lawyers in the United States and allows users to search for lawyers using factors like geography, specialty, language and law school. Lawyers in the database are assigned an ISLN (International Standard Lawyer Number).

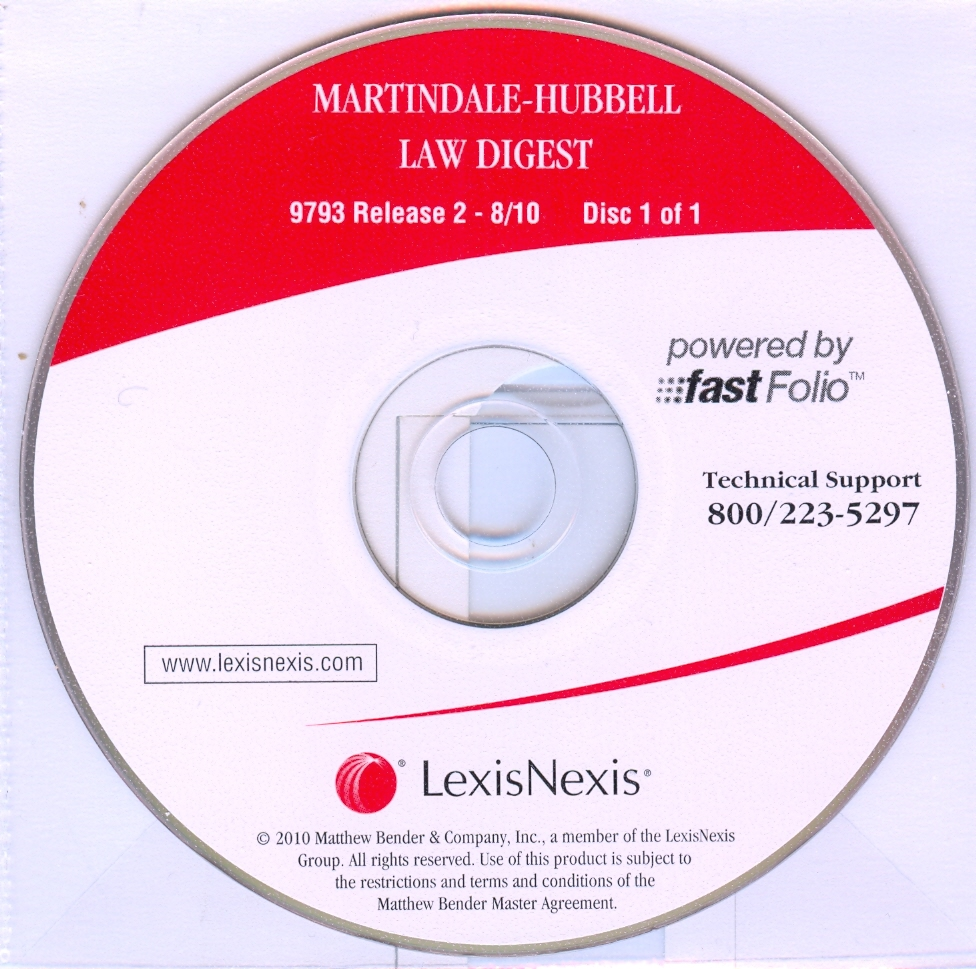
2010 Edition of Martindale Hubbell Law Digest on CD-ROM. This was the last published edition of the Law Digest.

- The Law Blog includes posts from lawyers on issues, trends and news in the legal profession such as immigration, personal injury, estate planning, etc. In November 2011 the Lawyers.com blog launched a New Jury Roundup weekly news feature entitled, "Editor's Choice: Jury Awards Edition". The news feature reports on large jury awards won by individuals in recent personal injury cases.
- Ratings of lawyers for their legal ability and ethical standards.
