= Victoria Hospital for Sick Children, Kingston upon Hull =

Hospital in Yorkshire, England, 1980–2020

Coordinates: 53.74712°N 0.352979°W

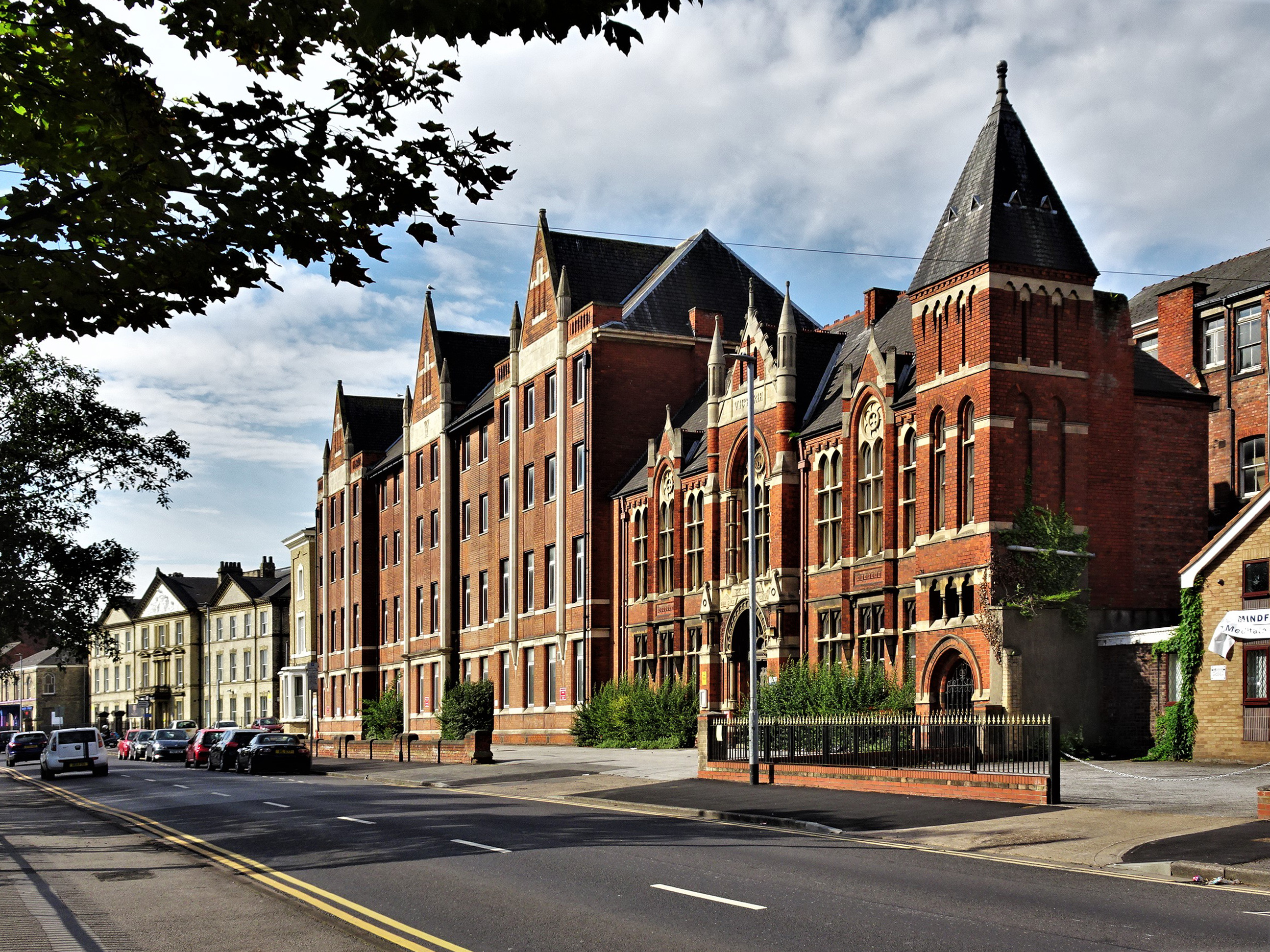
Victoria House on Park Street

Victoria Hospital for Sick Children, previously known as the Hospital for Sick Poor Children, was a children's hospital in Kingston upon Hull which operated from 1874 until 1967. After it closed the building was renamed Victoria House and continued to be used for administrative purposes until 2020.

== History ==
Discussions over the creation of a hospital for sick children originated from an article published by Rev. G. T. Coster in 1872. A new hospital, the Hospital for Sick Poor Children opened on Story Street in 1874 with enough room for 30 beds. The hospital was expanded in 1876 to include an outpatients department and in 1888 an additional outpatients building was opened on The Boulevard. In July 1885, the hospital opened a convalescent home in Hornsea.

The name of the hospital changed to Victoria Hospital for Sick Children in 1886. A new building was opened on Park Street in 1891 at an estimated cost of £7,500. It was built in red brick and constructed in the Gothic Revival architectural style. It became a grade II listed building in 1994.

The hospital closed after patient care was transferred to the Hull Royal Infirmary when the Infirmary moved to new premises in 1967. The building was renamed Victoria House and continued to be used for administrative purposes until 2020.

Dr Mary Murdoch worked at the hospital as her first appointment after graduating from the London School of Medicine for Women, she was Hull's first female doctor.
