= Wallace Smith Martindale =

American mathematician

Wallace Smith Martindale III (born August 1930 in Philadelphia) is an American mathematician, known for Martindale's Theorem (1969) and the Martindale ring of quotients introduced in the proof of the theorem. His 1969 paper generalizes Posner's theorem and a theorem of Amitsur and gives an independent, unified proof of the two theorems.

== Biography ==
Martindale received his Ph.D. in mathematics in 1958 from the University of Pennsylvania. He became a professor at the University of Massachusetts Amherst and retired there as professor emeritus in 1996.

He is the father of two daughters. When he was 81 years old, Martindale, with one of his daughters, climbed Mount Kilimanjaro.

== Selected publications ==
=== Articles ===
- Martindale, Wallace S. (1958). "The structure of a special class of rings". Proceedings of the American Mathematical Society. 9 (5): 714. doi:10.1090/S0002-9939-1958-0098115-9.
- Martindale, Wallace S. (1963). "Lie isomorphisms of primitive rings". Proceedings of the American Mathematical Society. 14 (6): 909. doi:10.1090/S0002-9939-1963-0160798-4.
- Martindale, Wallace S. (1969). "Lie Isomorphisms of Prime Rings". Transactions of the American Mathematical Society. 142: 437–455. doi:10.2307/1995366. JSTOR 1995366.
- Martindale 3rd, Wallace S. (1972). "Prime rings with involution and generalized polynomial identities" (PDF). Journal of Algebra. 22 (3): 502–516. doi:10.1016/0021-8693(72)90164-0.
- Martindale, Wallace S. (1973). "On semiprime P. I. Rings". Proceedings of the American Mathematical Society. 40 (2): 365. doi:10.1090/S0002-9939-1973-0318215-3.
- Martindale 3rd, Wallace S. (1976). "Lie isomorphisms of the skew elements of a prime ring with involution". Communications in Algebra. 4 (10): 929–977. doi:10.1080/00927877608822146. 1975
- Baxter, W.E.; Martindale III, W.S. (1979). "Central closure of semiprime non-associative rings". Communications in Algebra. 7 (11): 1103–1132. doi:10.1080/00927877908822394.
- Baxter, W. E.; Martindale 3rd, W. S. (1979). "Jordan homomorphisms of semi prime rings" (PDF). Journal of Algebra. 56 (2): 457–471. doi:10.1016/0021-8693(79)90349-1.
- Bell, H. E.; Martindale, W. S. (1987). "Centralizing Mappings of Semiprime Rings". Canadian Mathematical Bulletin. 30: 92–101. doi:10.4153/CMB-1987-014-x.
- Martindale, W. S.; Rosen, M. P.; Rosen, J. D. (1990). "Extended centroids of power series rings". Glasgow Mathematical Journal. 32 (3): 371–375. doi:10.1017/S0017089500009459.
- Bresar, M.; Martindale, W.S.; Miers, C.R. (1993). "Centralizing Maps in Prime Rings with Involution". Journal of Algebra. 161 (2): 342–357. doi:10.1006/jabr.1993.1223. hdl:1828/2661.
- Brešar, Matej; Martindale, W.S.; Miers, Robert C. (1998). "Maps preserving nth powers". Communications in Algebra. 26: 117–138. doi:10.1080/00927879808826120. hdl:1828/2826.
- Beidar, K.I.; Martindale, W.S. (1998). "On Functional Identities in Prime Rings with Involution". Journal of Algebra. 203 (2): 491–532. doi:10.1006/jabr.1997.7285.
- Beidar, K. I.; Brešar, M.; Chebotar, M. A.; Martindale, W. S. (2001). "On Herstein's Lie map conjectures, I". Transactions of the American Mathematical Society. 353 (10): 4235–4260. doi:10.1090/S0002-9947-01-02731-3. ISSN 0002-9947.
- Beidar, K.I; Brešar, M.; Chebotar, M.A; Martindale, W.S (2001). "On Herstein's Lie Map Conjectures, II". Journal of Algebra. 238: 239–264. doi:10.1006/jabr.2000.8628.
- Beidar, K.I.; Brešar, M.; Chebotar, M.A.; Martindale, W.S. (2002). "On Herstein's Lie Map Conjectures, III". Journal of Algebra. 249 (1): 59–94. doi:10.1006/jabr.2001.9076. ISSN 0021-8693.
- Cabello, J. C.; Cabrera, M.; López, G.; Martindale, W. S. (2004). "Multiplicative Semiprimeness of Skew Lie Algebras". Communications in Algebra. 32 (9): 3487–3501. doi:10.1081/AGB-120039626. S2CID 120393064.
- Martindale 3rd, W. S. (July 2007). "Lie maps in prime rings: a personal perspective". Rings and Nearrings: Proceedings of the International Conference on Algebra, in Memory of Kostia Beidar, Tainan, Taiwan, March 6-12, 2005. Walter De Gruyter Inc. pp. 95–110. ISBN 9783110912166.

=== Books ===
- Beidar, Konstant I.; Martindale, Wallace S.; Mikhalev, Alexander V. (17 November 1995). Rings with Generalized Identities. ISBN 9780824793258.
- Brešar, Matej; Chebotar, Mikhail A.; Martindale, Wallace S. (8 August 2007). Functional Identities. ISBN 9783764377960.
