= Carrie Adeline Barbour =

American paleontologist (1861–1942)

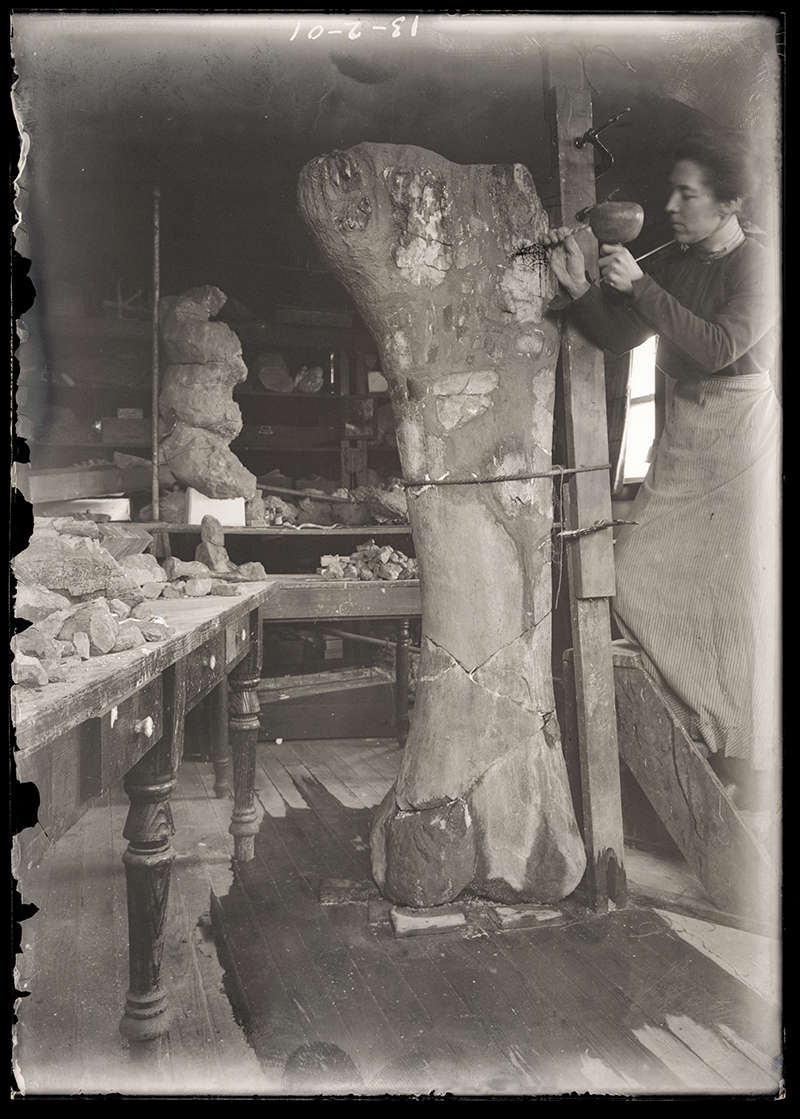
- Barbour working on a dinosaur femur at the University of Nebraska State Museum
- Born: October 1, 1861; Springfield, Posey County, Indiana, US
- Died: June 9, 1942 (aged 80); Lincoln, Nebraska, US
- Burial place: Wyuka Cemetery
- Occupations: College professor and museum curator
- Family: Erwin Hinckley Barbour (brother)

Academic background
- Education: Oxford Female College

Academic work
- Discipline: Paleontology and Art
- Institutions: Iowa College University of Nebraska University of Nebraska State Museum

Carrie Adeline Barbour (October 1, 1861 – June 9, 1942) was an American paleontologist and educator. As an assistant curator of paleontology at the University of Nebraska State Museum and an Assistant Professor of Paleontology, Barbour was among the earliest women paleontologists in the United States.

== Early life ==
One of Adeline (Hinkley) and Samuel Williamson Barbour's five children, Carrie Adeline Barbour was born in Springfield, Posey County, Indiana, on October 1, 1861, five years after her brother, Erwin H. Barbour. She grew up near Oxford, Ohio, and, as a child, became interested in art and science while sketching and collecting items for her mother's herbarium.

Carrie Barbour studied at Oxford Female College from 1886 to 1887, but the Oxford Female College Bulletin does not indicate she attended or graduated as a college-level student.

== Career ==
After college, Barbour taught wood carving and china painting at Iowa College in Grinnell, Iowa. In 1891, her brother Erwin Hinckley Barbour became a geology professor at the University of Nebraska in Lincoln, Nebraska; he was also appointed the curator of the University of Nebraska State Museum. Edwin asked his sister to help with fieldwork to collect specimens for the museum.

In 1892, she moved to the Department of Art at the University of Nebraska. Although wood carving and art remained an interest throughout her life, Barbour's career shifted to focus on paleontology under her brother's guidance. In 1893, she continued to teach china painting for the art department and became assistant curator of paleontology at the University of Nebraska State Museum, a position she held for 48 years. She may have been the first woman employed and paid as a paleontologist in the United States

Barbour participated in the fieldwork. However, she excelled at preparing both vertebrate and invertebrate fossils back at the museum. At the seventh annual meeting of the Nebraska Academy of Sciences in December 1896, she presented the paper, "Some Methods of Collecting, Preserving, and Studying Fossils," which offered approaches for handling disintegrated specimens

Barbour was among the six members of the sixth annual Morrill Geological Expedition in 1897, coordinated by the University of Nebraska and the Nebraska Geological Survey. That year, the expedition focused on sites in South Dakota, western Nebraska, and Wyoming and included work in Nebraska's Daemonelix beds, the Bad Lands, and the Black Hills regions. During the 1899 Morrill expedition, she led assistants collecting invertebrate fossils in Carboniferous exposures. Barbour and an assistant collected over 20,000 specimens that summer. Following the expedition, some of the duplicate specimens collected were donated to 40 institutions across the country.

In 1912, she was appointed as assistant professor of paleontology at the University of Nebraska, working in this position for 25 years. She was a member of the Nebraska Academy of Sciences.

== Personal life ==
Barbour died on June 9, 1942, at her brother Edwin's home in Lincoln, Nebraska. She is buried in Wyuka Cemetery in Lincoln.

== Published works ==
- Barbour, Carrie Adeline. “Some Methods of Collecting, Preserving, and Studying Fossils,” Nebraska Academy of Sciences, December 30, 1896.
- —“Observations on the Concretions of the Pierre Shale,” Proceedings, 1897-1900.
- — "Report on the Work of the Morrill Geological Expeditions of the University of Nebraska" (June 1900). Science, New Series, vol. 11, no. 283. (June 1900): 856–858.

== See also ==
- List of Graduate Women in Science members
