= Charles H. Morrill Homestead =

- U.S. National Register of Historic Places
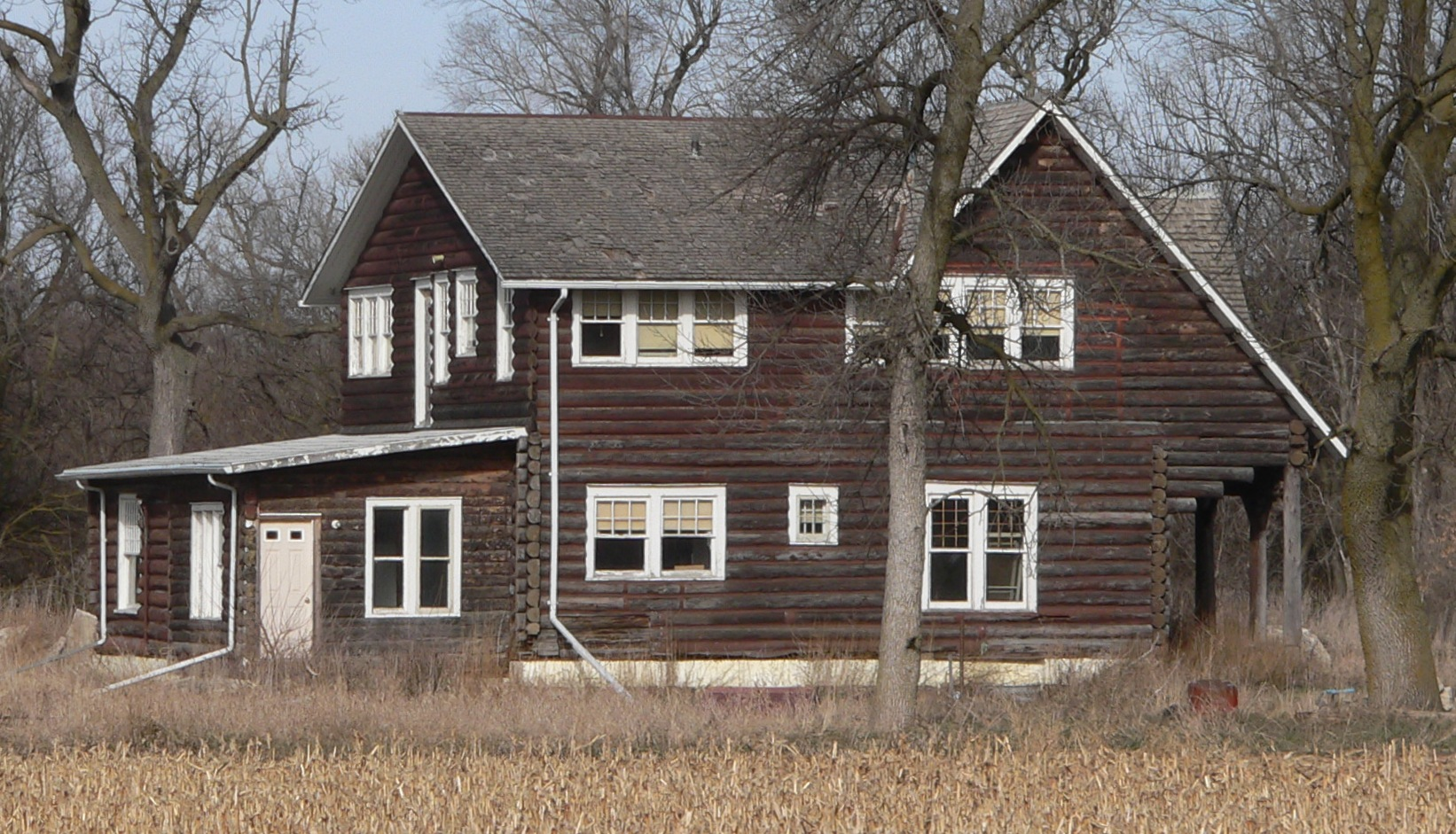
- The house in 2010

- Location within Nebraska Location within the United States
- Nearest city: Stromsburg, Nebraska
- Coordinates: 41°06′23″N 97°35′35″W
- Area: 0.5 acres (0.20 ha)
- Built: 1872
- Built by: Ludwig Rudeen
- Architectural style: Bungalow/craftsman, Log house
- NRHP reference No.: 73001072
- Added to NRHP: June 4, 1973

The Charles H. Morrill Homestead is a historic house in Stromsburg, Nebraska. It was built in 1872 by Ludwig Rudeen, a Swedish immigrant, for Charles Henry Morrill, a homesteader. Morrill was also the founder of the Stromsburg Bank, and a member of the Republican National Committee. The house was designed in the Swiss chalet style. It has been listed on the National Register of Historic Places since June 4, 1973.
