= Elizabeth Honor Dolan =

American artist (1871–1948)

Elizabeth Honor Dolan (1871–1948) was an American artist known for her natural history murals in museums in New York and Nebraska.

== Biography ==
Elizabeth Honor Dolan was born May 20, 1871, in Fort Dodge, Iowa. Soon after she was born her family moved to Tecumseh, Nebraska. She studied at the University of Nebraska under Sara Shewell Hayden, at the School of the Art Institute of Chicago in 1912, and the New York Students' Art League in 1914. While in New York she designed stained glass for Louis Tiffany. In 1924, on a scholarship, she moved to France and attended the Fontainebleau School of Fine Arts, where she was able to study fresco painting under Francias Garguit. While there she developed her specialty of mural painting and was influenced by Puvis de Chavannes.

== Career ==
In 1926 Dolan was commissioned to do a series of murals for the University of Nebraska State Museum, Morrill Hall, in Lincoln, Nebraska. The work, in fresco secco, included the East and West walls of the fossil Elephant Hall, whose walls span 17 feet high by 70 feet wide, as well as the backdrops for the first and second-floor wall cases in the Hall of Nebraska Wildlife. This work led to commissions for murals such as "World Peace" for the women's lounge in the University Student Union and the "Spirit of the Prairie" for the Nebraska State Capitol's Law Library in 1932. The latter shows a young woman as the Spirit, holding a baby, with her son and pet dog, on a grassy knoll, as her head is turned toward the East. Leonard Nelson (The author of a Capital Guide published in 1931) viewed this gaze as the mother looking east to visualize what the future held for her and her family.

Dolan researched her Nebraska natural history murals by going to the "bad lands" of Sioux and Devils Gulch in Iowa, where she studied the landscapes and adapted them for imagined ancient terrain. The murals may appear as if paint has been casually applied, but her brushwork and the subdued color palette convey both solidity and depth.

In 1932 Dolan received a commission to paint a mural of northwestern India for The Age of Man Hall in the American Museum of Natural History in New York City. During this time Lincoln Masonic Temple purchased ten murals from her for their new building and she also made several smaller pictures of landscapes and Lincolnites. Among her other commissions were ones for the University of Nebraska Student Union, the Lincoln Y.W.C.A, Lincoln Unitarian Church, the New York World Fair of 1939, The University of Nebraska Club, and Hansel and Gretel for the Children's Reading Room of the Lincoln Public Library.
