= Agate Fossil Beds National Monument =

National monument in Nebraska, United States

- IUCN category III (natural monument or feature)
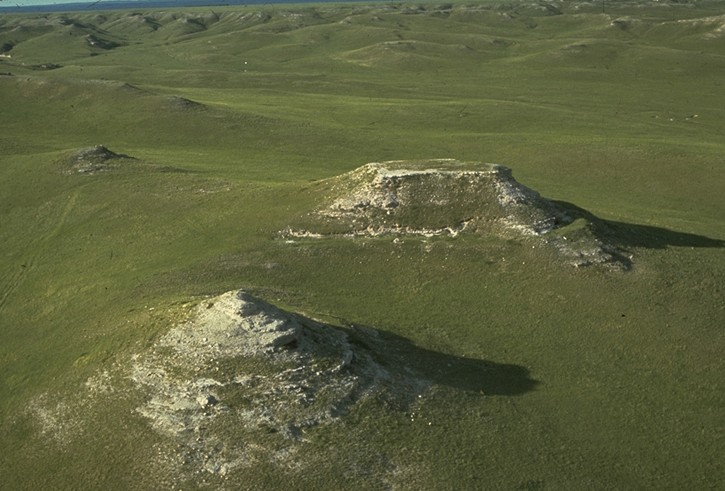
- University and Carnegie Hills fossil beds

- Location within Nebraska Location within the United States
- Interactive map of Agate Fossil Beds National Monument
- Location: Sioux County, Nebraska, United States
- Nearest city: Harrison, NE
- Coordinates: 42°25′18″N 103°45′14″W
- Area: 3,057.87 acres (12.3748 km^{2})
- Established: June 14, 1997
- Visitors: 16,827 (in 2025)
- Governing body: National Park Service
- Website: Agate Fossil Beds National Monument

Agate Fossil Beds National Monument is a U.S. National Monument near Harrison, Nebraska. The main features of the monument are a valley of the Niobrara River and the fossils found on Carnegie Hill and University Hill.

The area largely consists of grass-covered plains. Plants on the site include prairie sandreed, blue grama, little bluestem and needle and thread grass, and the wildflowers lupin, spiderwort, western wallflower and sunflowers.

== History ==
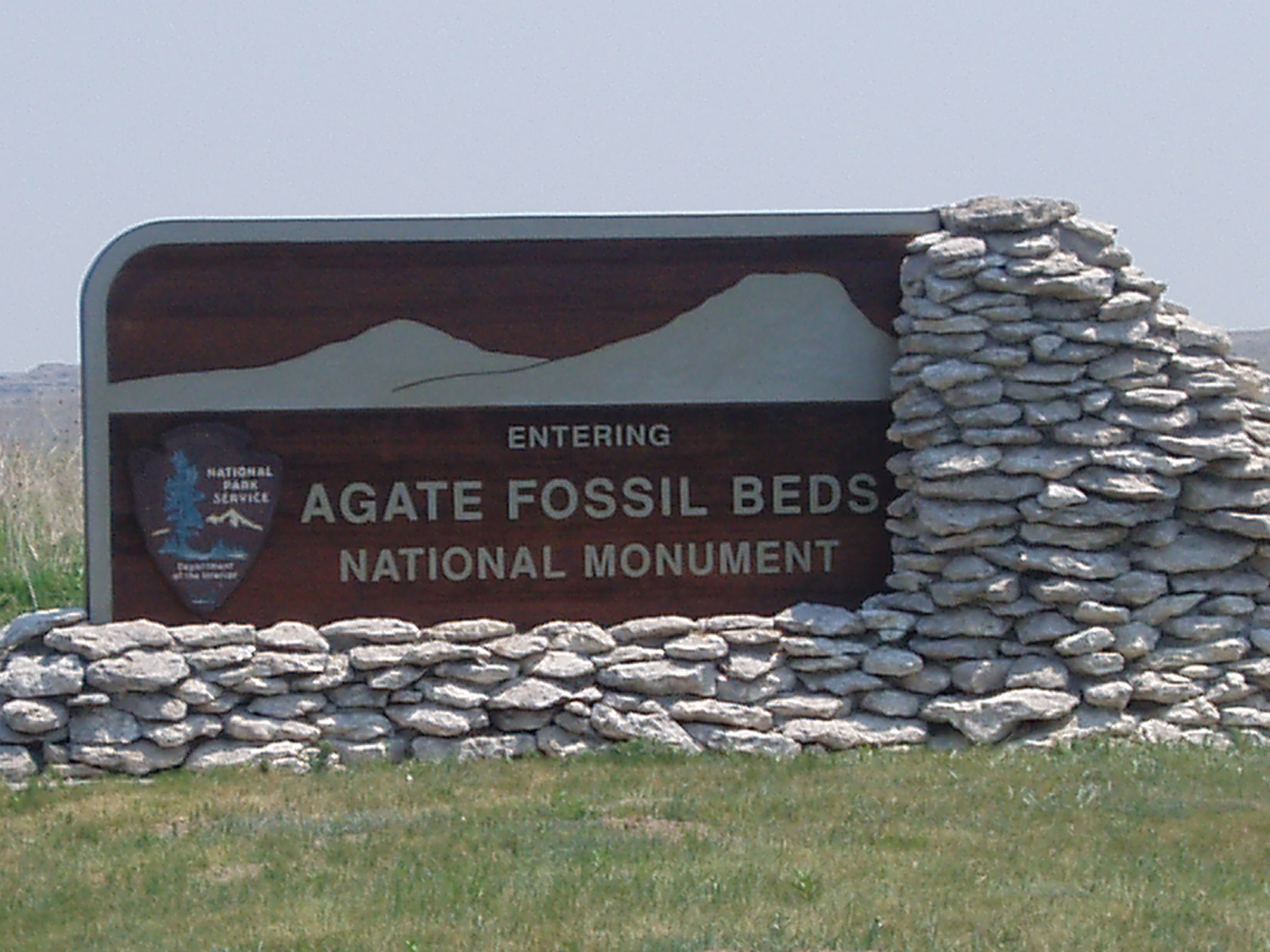
Entrance to the monument

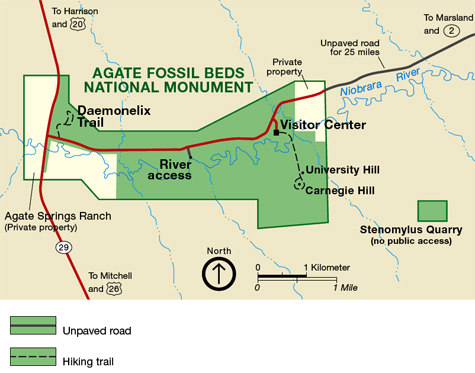
Map of Agate Fossil Beds

Most of the land that is now the National Monument was part of the Agate Springs Ranch, a working cattle ranch, owned by James and Kate Cook, who bought the ranch in 1887. In 1892, Erwin H. Barbour of the University of Nebraska was the first scientist to examine artifacts at the site. In 1904, Olaf Peterson of the Carnegie Museum in Pittsburgh was the first paleontologist to do extensive excavations. Between 1904 and 1923 there was spirited competition between groups of paleontologists from The American Museum of Natural History, Yale University, and other institutions. The findings were especially significant because they contained full skeletons of extinct Miocene mammals, species previously only known through fragments.

There are several theories as to why such a rich trove of fossils is found at this location. One is that a drought may have brought a large number of herd animals together near sparse water sources, where they died in proximity to each other. Another is that animal carcasses were swept down the ancient rivers and deposited there due to the particular geometry of the river bends and eddies. Another is that animals became trapped in quicksand there.

The monument's museum collection also contains more than 500 artifacts from the Cook Collection of Plains Indians artifacts.

The national monument was authorized on June 5, 1965, but was not established until June 14, 1997. The Harold J. Cook Homestead (Bone Cabin Complex) was listed on the National Register of Historic Places in 1977. Agate Fossil Beds is maintained by the National Park Service.

== Paleontology ==
The site is best known for a large number of well-preserved Miocene fossils, many of which were found at dig sites on Carnegie and University Hills. Fossils from the Harrison Formation and Anderson Ranch Formation, which date to the Arikareean in the North American land mammal classification, about 20 to 16.3 million years ago, are among some of the best specimens of Miocene mammals.

Species found in Agate include:

- Merychippus and Parahippus, ancestors of the modern day horse.
- Diceratherium, two-horned rhinoceros.
- Menoceras, pony-sized rhinoceros, the most common animal found in the fossil beds.
- Daphoenodon and Ysengrinia, two types of mid-sized bear dogs.
- Promerycochoerus, a semiaquatic hippo-like oreodont.
- Daeodon, the largest Entelodont (giant pig-like ungulate).
- Stenomylus, gazelle-like camelids.
- Oxydactylus, giraffe-like camelids.
- Palaeocastor, land beavers that dug large corkscrew-shaped burrows (Daemonelix).
- Moropus, a chalicothere which are relatives of rhinos and horses.
- Merychyus, a sheep-like oreodont.
- Syndyoceras, antelope-like mammal and extinct relatives of artiodactyls.

== Gallery ==
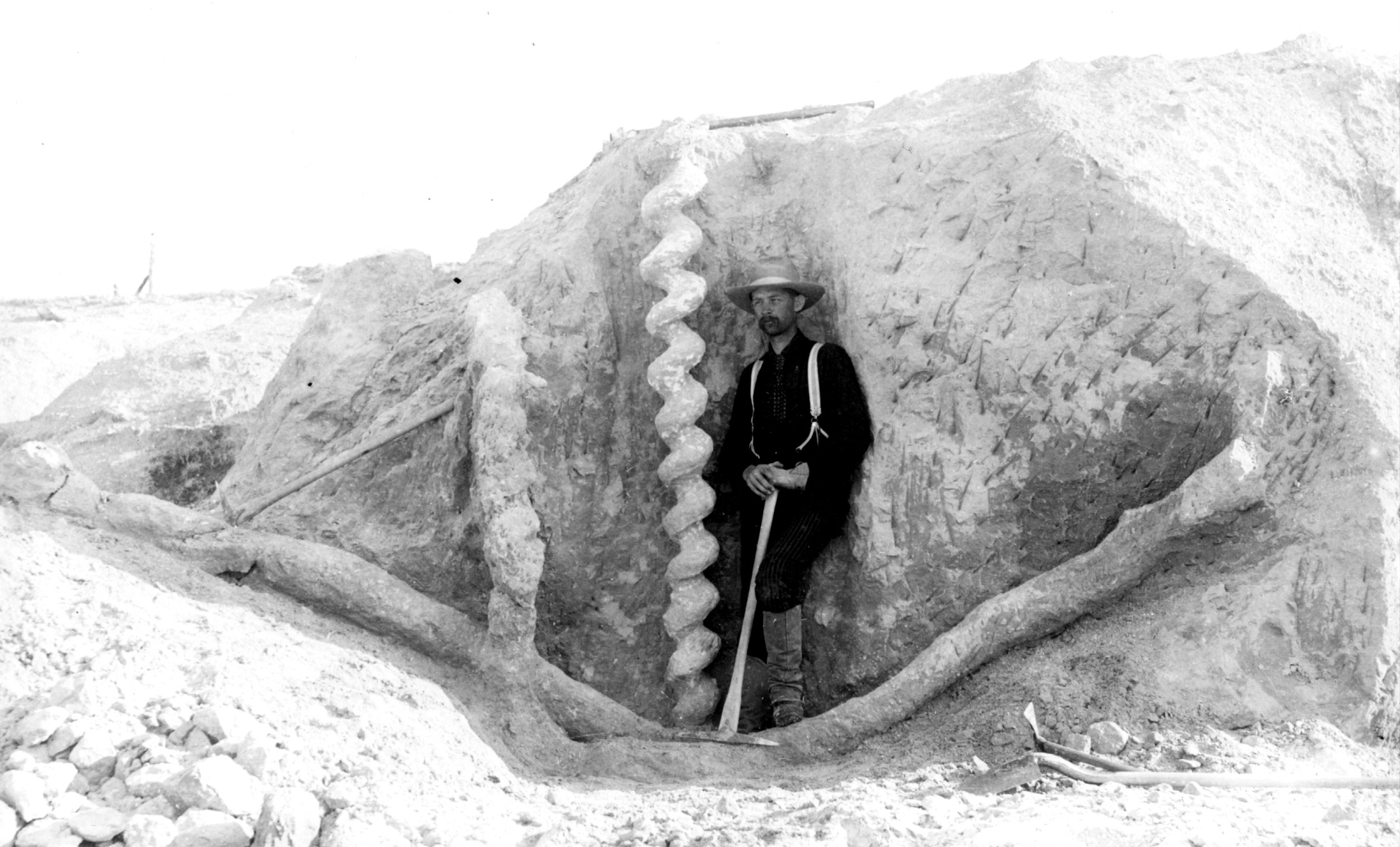
"Devil's corkscrews", Miocene-age burrows of Palaeocastor, discovered in the late 19th century

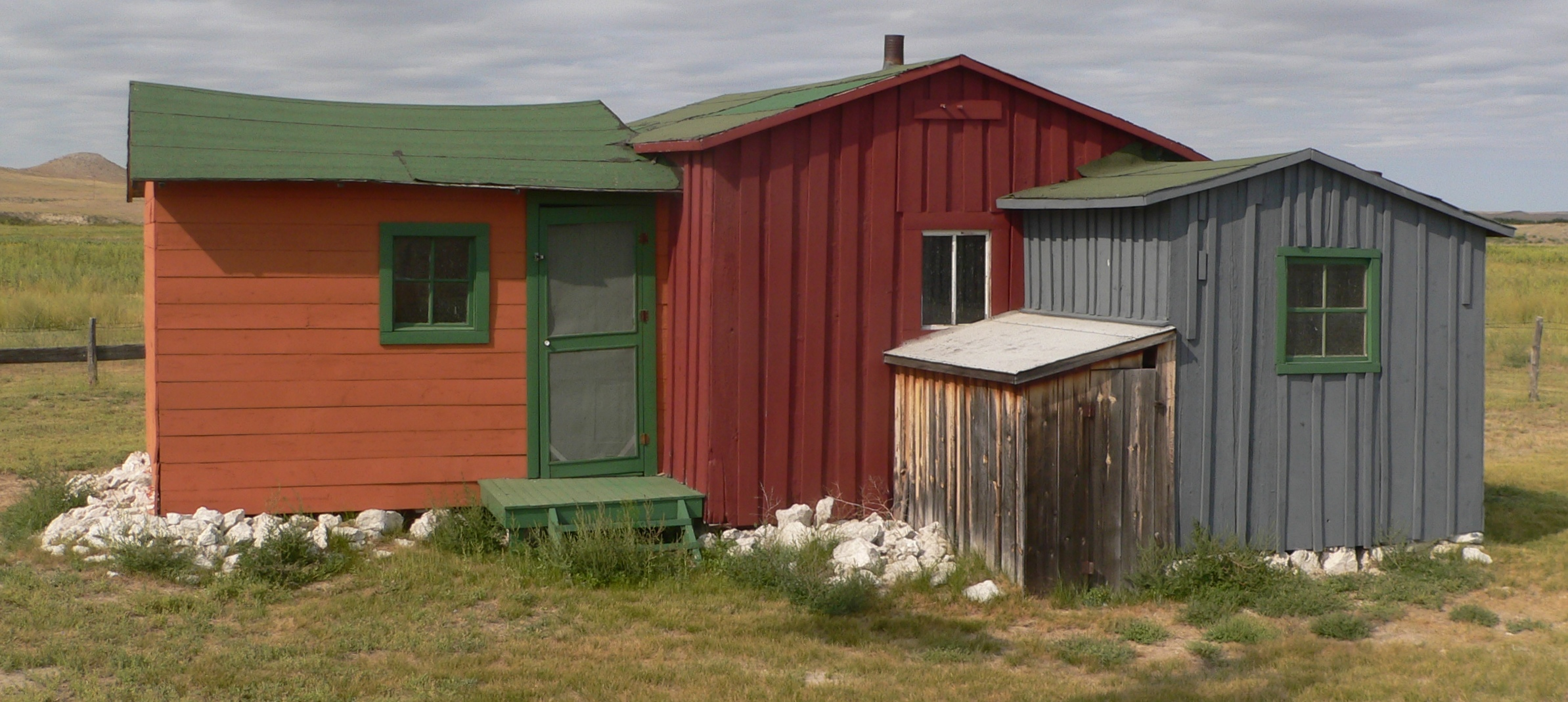
The Bone Cabin, used during twenty-five years of fossil excavations at the Agate Fossil Beds

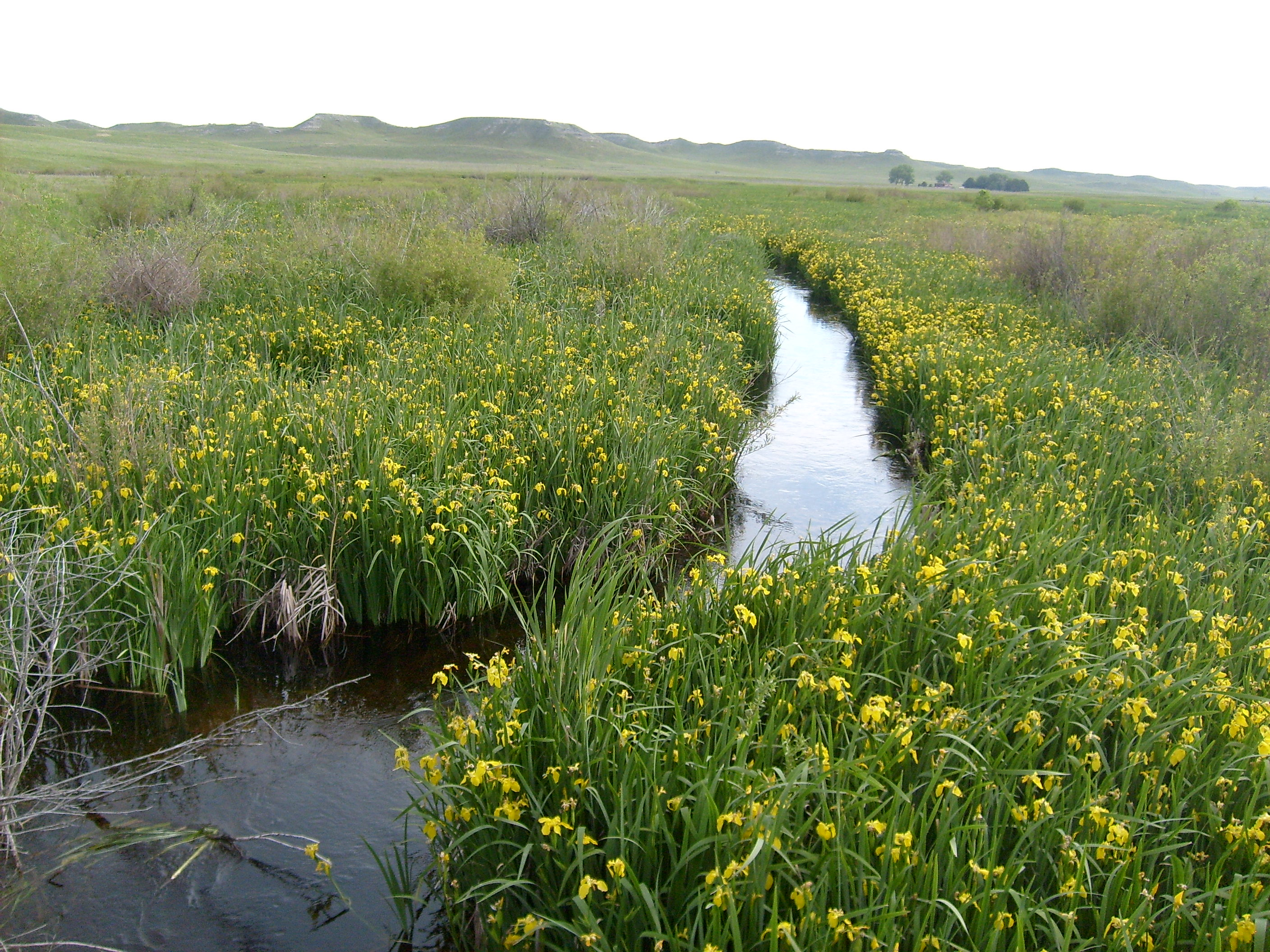
The Niobrara River flowing through Agate Fossil Beds

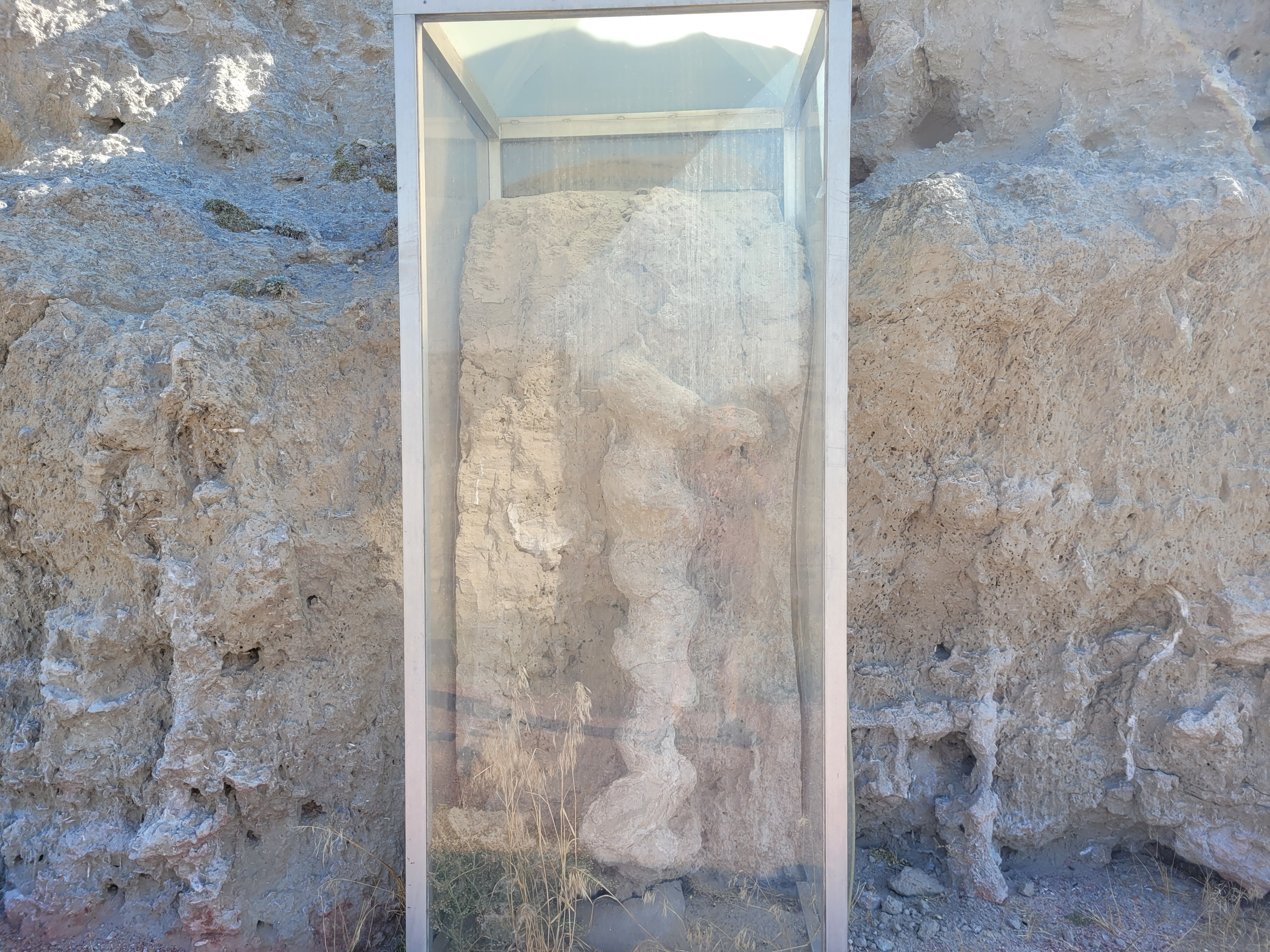
A Daemonelix corkscrew fossil exhibit

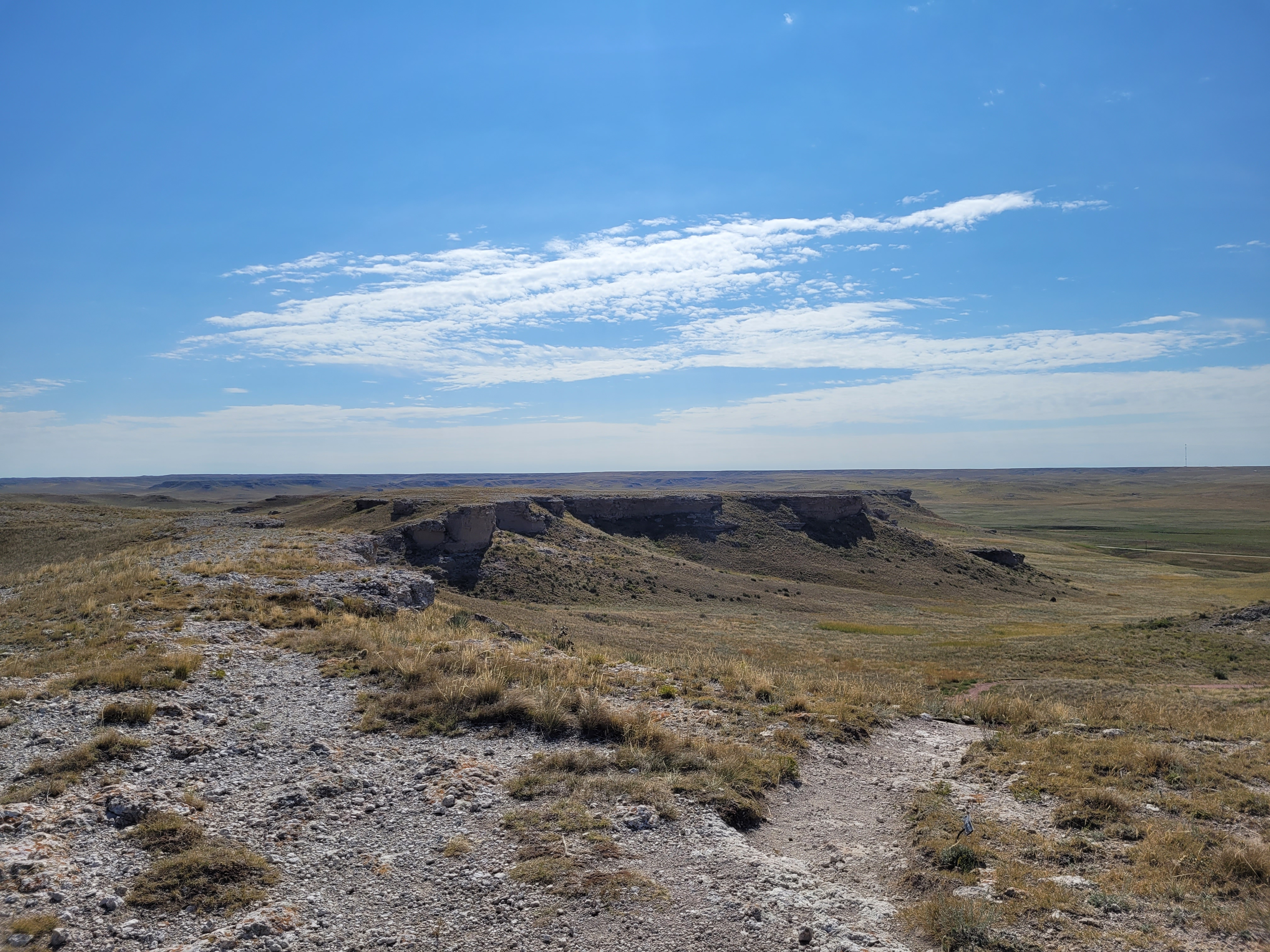
View of the park from the Daemonelix Trail

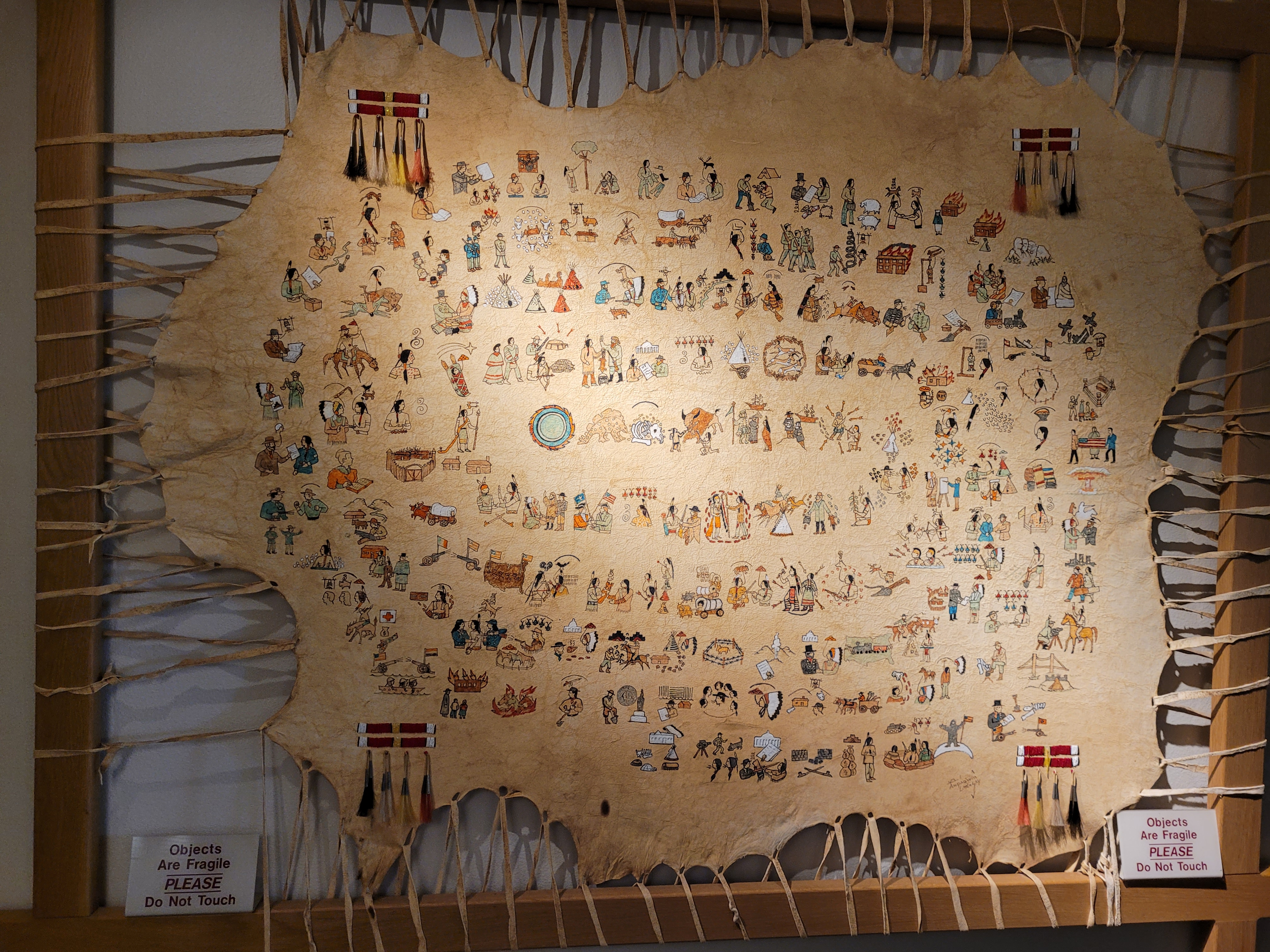
Plains Indian pictographs on a hide at the Agate Visitor Center

== See also ==
- List of fossil sites
- List of national monuments of the United States
- Ashfall Fossil Beds
- Florissant Fossil Beds National Monument
- John Day Fossil Beds National Monument
- Scotts Bluff National Monument
