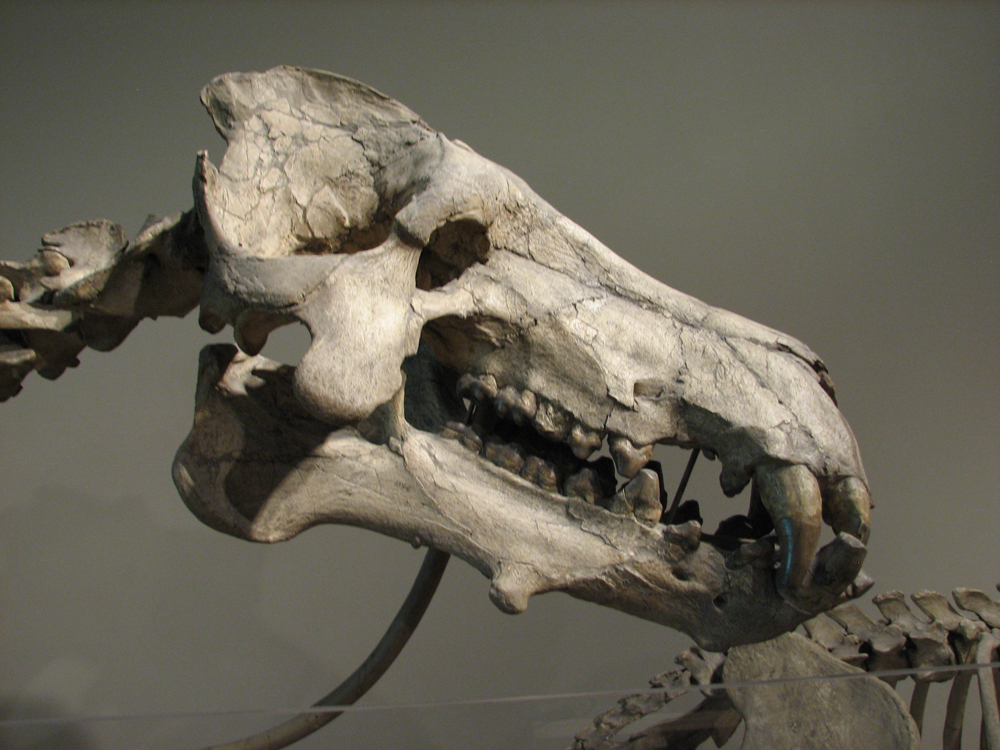
- A skull of D. shoshonensis at the Carnegie Museum of Natural History

Scientific classification
- Kingdom: Animalia
- Phylum: Chordata
- Class: Mammalia
- Order: Artiodactyla
- Family: †Entelodontidae
- Genus: †Daeodon; Cope, 1878

Type species
- †Daeodon shoshonensis Cope, 1878

Species
- †D. shoshonensis Cope, 1878; †D. humerosum? Cope, 1879

Synonyms
- Boochoerus Cope, 1879; Ammodon Marsh, 1893; Dinohyus Peterson, 1905b

= Daeodon =

Daeodon Temporal range: Early Oligocene to Early Miocene (Arikareean–Hemingfordian) ~29–19 Ma

Extinct genus of mammals

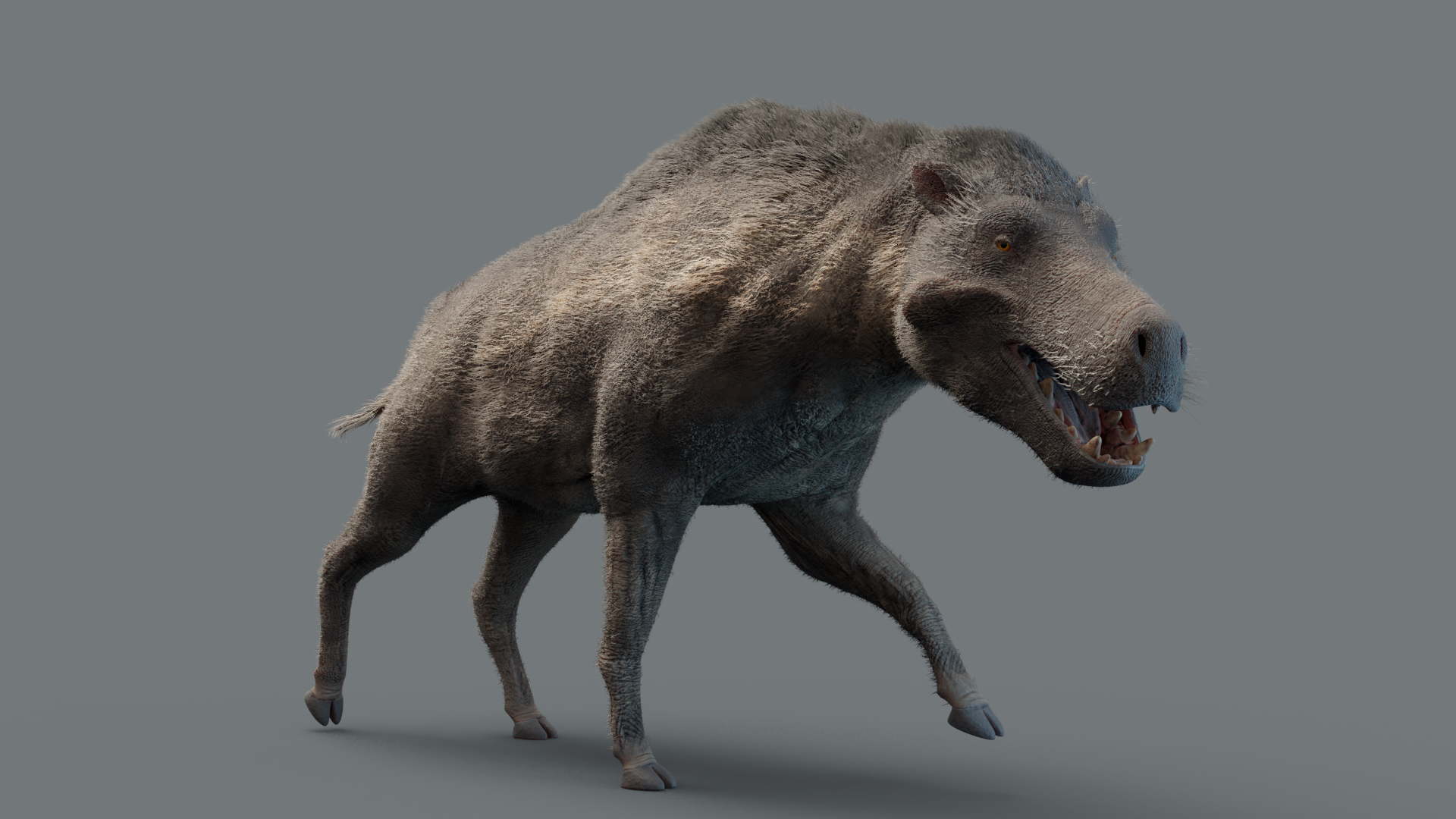
Daeodon shoshonensis life restoration

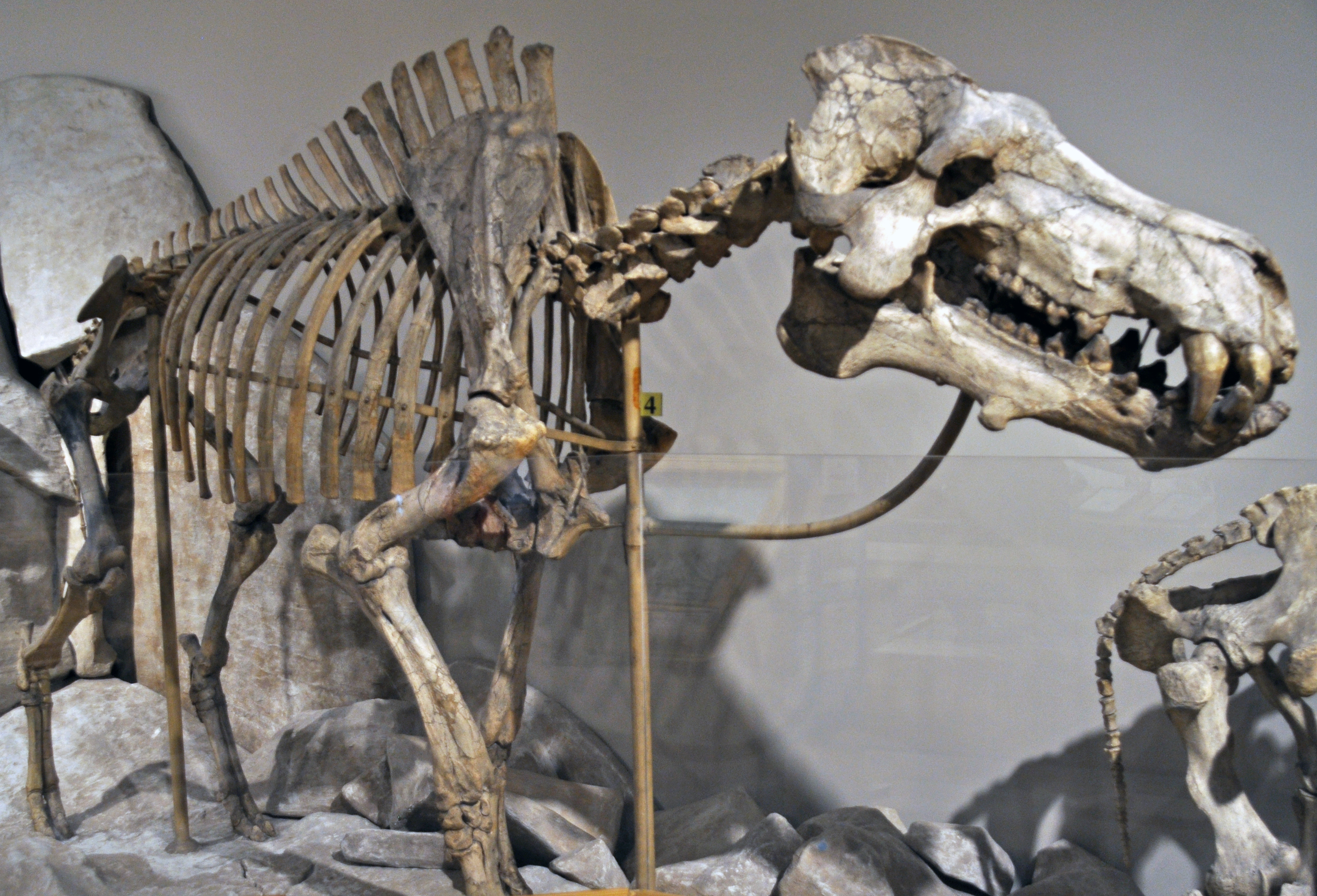
Daeodon (Dinohyus) hollandi, complete skeleton from the Agate Springs Fossil Quarry in Nebraska. See text for nomenclature history

Daeodon is an extinct genus of entelodont even-toed ungulates that inhabited North America about 29 to 19 million years ago from the Early Oligocene to late Early Miocene, making it the last known entelodont. The type species is Daeodon shoshonensis, described from a very fragmentary holotype by Cope. Some authors synonymize it with Dinohyus hollandi and several other species (see below), but due to the lack of diagnostic material, this may be questionable.

Another large member of this family, possibly larger than Daeodon, is the Asian Paraentelodon, but it is known by very incomplete material.

== Taxonomy ==
The genus Daeodon was erected by the American anatomist and paleontologist Edward Drinker Cope in 1878. He classified it as a perissodactyl and thought that it was closely related to Menodus. This classification persisted until the description of "Elotherium" calkinsi in 1905, a very similar and much more complete animal from the same rocks, which was promptly assigned as a species of Dynohyus by Peterson (1909). This led to Daeodon's reclassification as a member of the family Entelodontidae. The exact relationships between Daeodon and other entelodonts are not well understood; some authors (Lucas et al., 1998) consider the greater morphological similarity of Daeodon to Paraentelodon rather than to earlier North American entelodonts, like Archaeotherium, as evidence for Daeodon being a descendant from a Late Oligocene immigration of large Asian entelodonts to North America.

However, the existence of distinct specimens of Archaeotherium showing characters reminiscent of those present in both Paraentelodon and Daeodon raises the possibility of both genera actually descending from a North American common ancestor. Although not specified in Cope's original description, the name Daeodon comes from the Greek words daios, meaning "hostile" or "dreadful" and odon, meaning "teeth".

== Species ==
The type species of Daeodon is D. shoshonensis, which is based on a fragment of a lower jaw from the John Day Formation of Oregon. Several other species were assigned to the genus in the subsequent decades, like D. calkinsi, D. mento and D. minor. Since 1945, it had been suggested that two other taxa were actually junior synonyms of Daeodon, but the formalization of this referral didn't take place until the work of Lucas et al. (1998). Ammodon leidyanum, named by Cope's rival, O. C. Marsh, and Dinohyus hollandi, a complete skeleton from the Agate Springs quarry of Nebraska, were found to be indistinguishable from each other and in turn both were indistinguishable from D. shoshonensis. With the exception of D. calkinsi, which was tentatively excluded from Daeodon, the other previously recognized species of Daeodon were also synonymized to D. shoshonensis. That same year, an obscure entelodont, Boochoerus humerosum, was also synonymized to Daeodon by Foss and Fremd (1998) and, albeit its status as a distinct species was retained, they note that the differences could still be attributed to individual or population variation or sexual dimorphism.

== Description ==
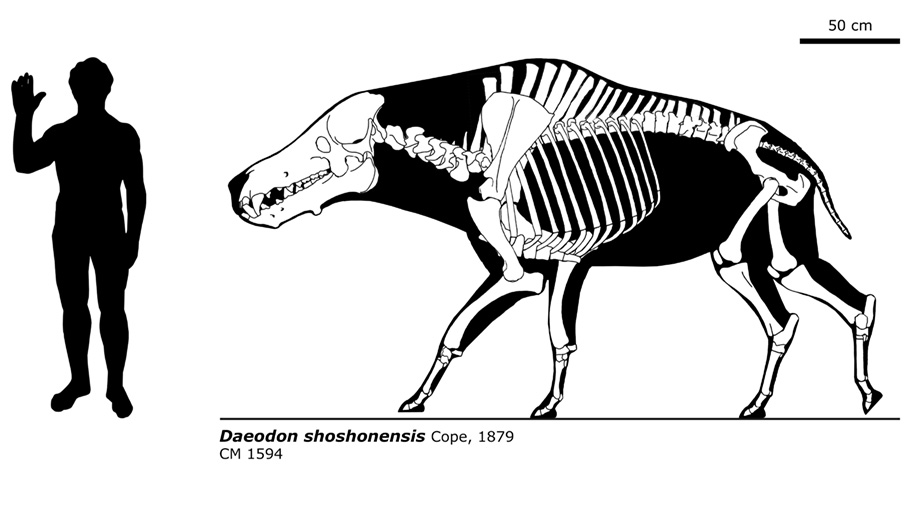
Skeletal restoration

Daeodon shoshonensis is the largest-known entelodont; known adult individuals had skull lengths of 90 cm (35 in), a shoulder height of 1.77 m (5 ft 10 in), and a full body length of 3.7 m (12 ft 2 in), with large males estimated to have weighed at least 750 kg (1,650 lb). Daeodon is differentiated from other entelodonts by a suite of unique dental characters, the shape and relatively small size of the cheekbone flanges of its skull compared to those of Archaeotherium, and the small size of its chin tubercle, as well as features of its carpus and tarsus and the fusion of the bones of the lower leg. Like other entelodonts, its limbs were long and slender with the bones of the foreleg fused together and with only two toes on each foot. It also had a relatively lightly constructed neck for the size of its head, whose weight was mostly supported by muscles and tendons attached to the tall spines of the thoracic vertebrae, similar to those of modern-day bison and white rhinoceros.

== Paleobiology and Paleoecology ==
=== Diet ===
Daeodon was omnivorous like all other entelodonts. Enamel patterns suggest eating of nuts, roots, and vines, as well as meat and bones. The superficial similarity to peccaries, hippos, and bears implies a wide range in terms of what plants Daeodon may have been eating. The dry seasons of North America at the time could get very harsh, so they may have supplemented their water intake by eating grape vines. The extent of its carnivory is debated, but tooth wear suggests they specialized in crushing bone and ripping meat, and bite marks on chalicothere bones suggest they either hunted or scavenged large herbivores. Foss (2001) argues its head was far too heavy to be effective in taking down large prey so it must have relied exclusively on scavenging, but its bison-like adaptations for running, the stereoscopic vision characteristic of predators, and evidence of predation in entelodonts calls this interpretation into question. The uncertainty of their diets suggests they were likely opportunistic omnivores similar to bears, eating whatever they needed depending on the circumstance.

=== Behavior ===
Entelodonts partook in intraspecific face biting, known from tooth marks on their skulls. Males would fight for dominance, possibly using their mandibular tubercles as protection in addition to their function as muscle attachments. Sexual dimorphism of the jugal protections exist in Archaeotherium, and with a smaller Daeodon sample size, such dimorphism can't be ruled out for Daeodon. If dimorphic, the function of the expanded jugals was likely for display, supporting large preorbital glands similar to those forest hogs possessed for chemical communication.

=== Habitat ===
Daeodon had a wide range in North America, with many fossils found in Agate Fossil Beds, representing an environment in a transition period between dense forests and expansive prairie, likely a major cause of their extinction in the early Miocene. It adapted to the grassland with a more cursorial body plan than more basal entelodonts like Archaeotherium, losing their dewclaws entirely, proximally fused metacarpals, and similar shoulder musculature to bison.

The Agate Springs bonebed was a floodplain environment with wet and dry seasons. Daeodon shared this landscape with small gazelle-like camels Stenomylus, the large browsing chalicothere Moropus, several species of predatory coyote- to wolf-sized amphicyonids that lived in packs, land beavers (Palaeocastor) that filled the ecological niche of modern prairie dogs, and thousands of small herd-living rhinoceros. The rhinos suffered massive periodic die-offs in the dry season, but Daeodon fossils are rare, which suggests they were neither social animals nor especially attracted to carrion.
