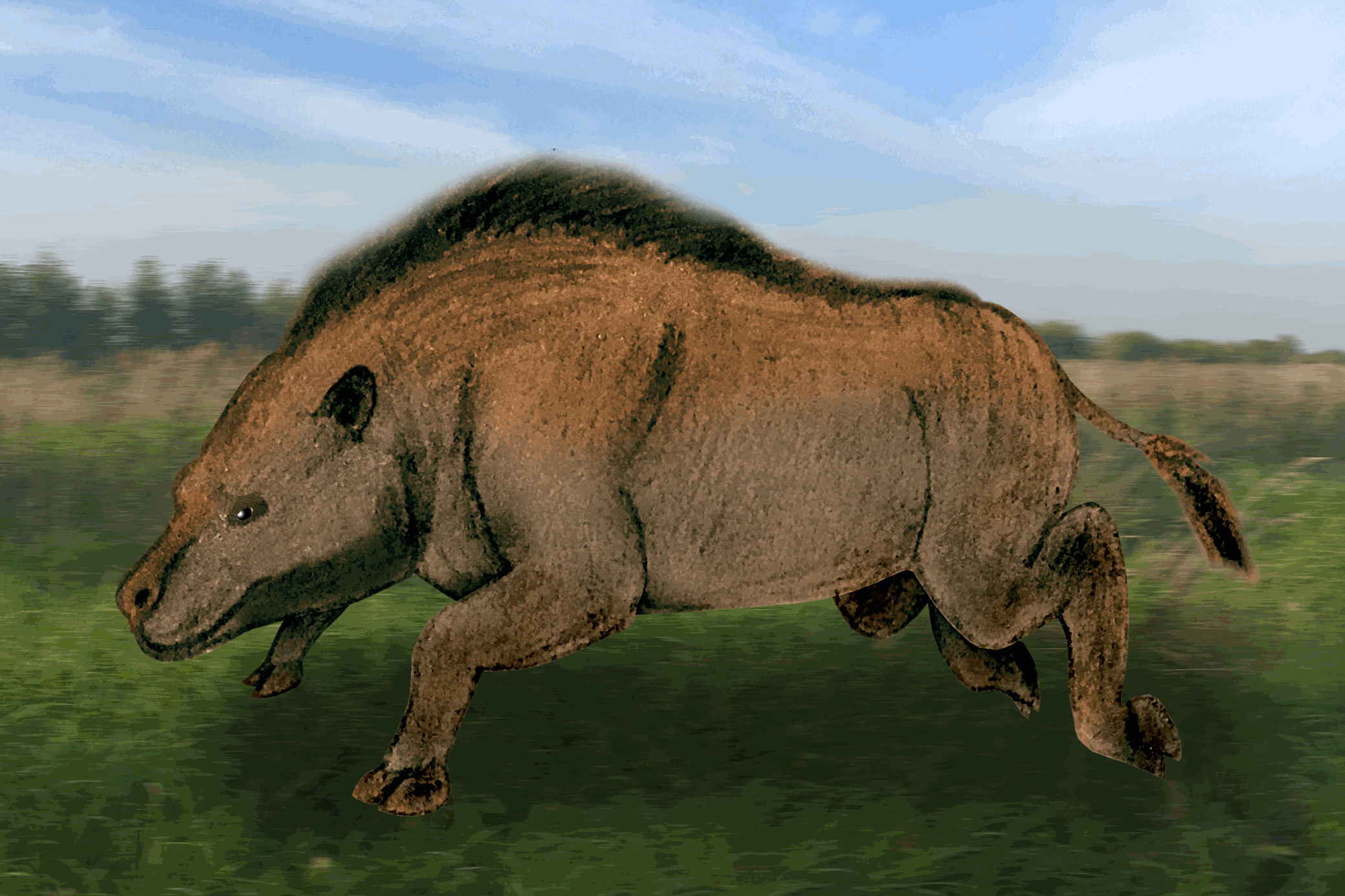
- Paraentelodon intermedium

Scientific classification
- Kingdom: Animalia
- Phylum: Chordata
- Class: Mammalia
- Order: Artiodactyla
- Family: †Entelodontidae
- Genus: †Paraentelodon; Gabunia, 1964
- Species: †P. intermedium

Binomial name
- †Paraentelodon intermedium Gabunia, 1964

Synonyms
- Neoentelodon dzhungaricus Aubekerova 1969; Paraentelodon macrognathus Qiu et al. 1990

= Paraentelodon =

Paraentelodon Temporal range: Oligocene (Rupelian to Chattian) 33.9–23.03 Ma

Extinct genus of entelodonts

Paraentelodon is an extinct entelodont from the Late Oligocene of Asia. The fossils of the type species P. intermedium were found in Georgia, Kazakhstan and China. An indeterminate species is known from Late Oligocene of Indo-Pakistan subcontinent.

== Discovery and naming ==
Paraentelodon was named by L. K. Gabunia in 1964 basing on molars and canine teeth that were found in Oligocene sites of Benara, Georgia (Georgian SSR at the time of discovery). It was assigned to Entelodontidae by Carroll (1988).

In 1996 Lucas and Emry found Neoentelodon to be synonymous with Paraentelodon.

Although Gabunia did not explain the etymology, the name Paraentelodon is derived from the Greek para/παρα "beside" or "near", ἐντελής entelēs "complete" or "perfect" and ὀδών odōn "tooth".

== Description and relationship ==
One of the largest entelodonts, it had much more massive teeth than those of Entelodon. The alleged indeterminate Paraentelodon species may be "Elodon transsilvanicus" (Kretzoi, 1941) from the Oligocene of Romania or a close relative, based on similar knolls on their molars. In spite of this, Paraentelodon had more common features with Asian and North American entelodonts. It was similar in size and form to the giant entelodont Daeodon from the early Miocene of North America. The structure of their teeth is visibly similar, but Paraentelodon has larger premolars, less reduction of a posterior group of third knolls, a smaller collar of cheek teeth, and other differing features. Some researchers suggest that it was either ancestral to, or shared an ancestor with Daeodon during a late Oligocene Beringian immigration. As with other entelodonts, it was an omnivore with large teeth that enabled it to crush bone and dig for tubers like its North American relatives.

== Paleoenvironment ==
In late Oligocene deposits of Balochistan, Paraentelodon sp. was found in the same crust as the giant rhinocerotoid Paraceratherium bugtiense and the anthracothere Anthracotherium bugtiense. The fauna of this locality also includes the bovid−like ruminant Palaeohypsodontus zinensis. The presence of these animals indicate an open forested habitat.

The jaws of Paraentelodon were found in the early Miocene Jiaozigou locality of China where a tusk of a Gomphotherium-like proboscidean was also present.
