= University of Nebraska State Museum =

Natural history museum in Lincoln, Nebraska, US

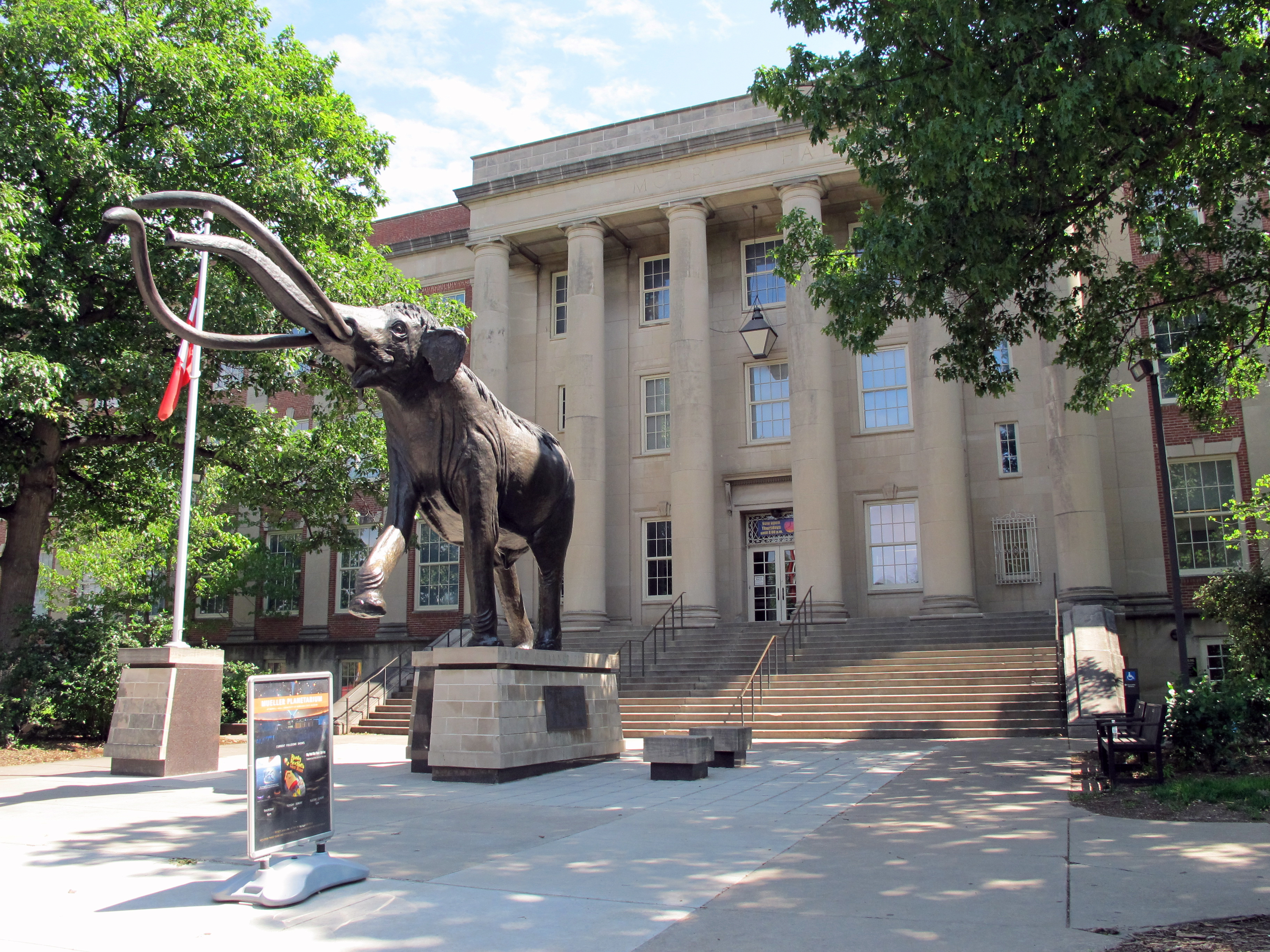
- The museum's north entrance
- Established: 1871; 155 years ago
- Location: 645 N. 14th Street; Lincoln, Nebraska, United States
- Coordinates: 40°49′12″N 96°42′6″W
- Type: Natural history museum
- Director: Susan Weller
- Owner: University of Nebraska–Lincoln
- Website: www.museum.unl.edu

The University of Nebraska State Museum (the NU State Museum) is a natural history museum housed in Morrill Hall on the campus of the University of Nebraska–Lincoln in Lincoln, Nebraska, United States. Founded in 1871, it features biodiversity, paleontology, and cultural diversity from across the Great Plains. It became a Smithsonian Affiliate in 2013.

The State Museum comprises four floors with ten permanent exhibits. Among these are Elephant Hall, which houses the world's largest articulated fossil mammoth among its collection of fossil elephants, and Mueller Planetarium, an interactive science center. Other exhibits feature paleontology, ancient life and evolution, wildlife, gems and minerals, and American Indian and African artifacts.

== History ==
=== Barbour and Morrill ===
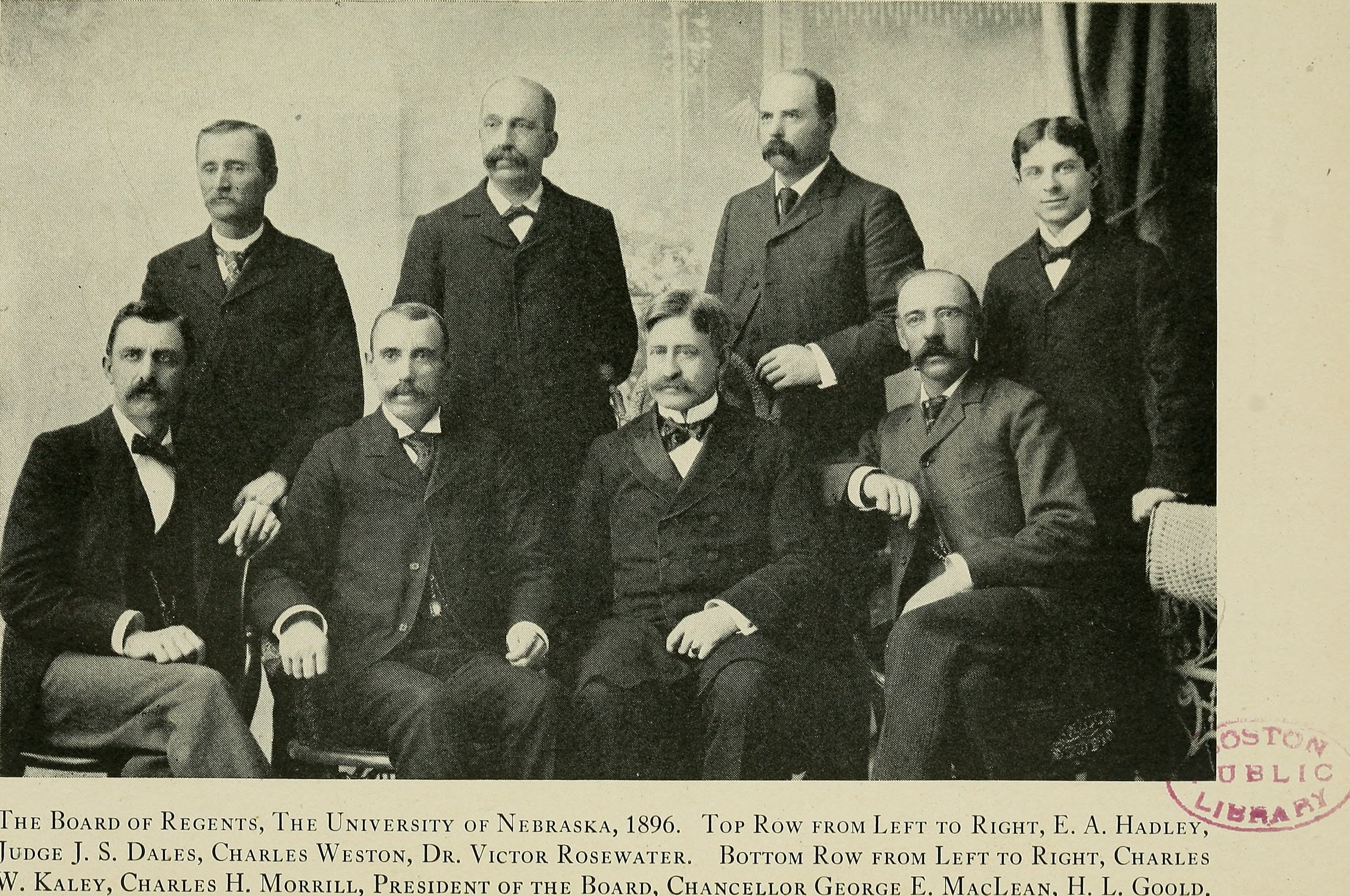
Charles Henry Morrill, seated second from left, was a significant donor to the museum in its formative years

The University of Nebraska State Museum was founded by Erwin Hinckley Barbour in 1871, two years after the University of Nebraska was established. The museum initially occupied just two rooms on separate floors in University Hall under the direction of Samuel Aughey, who helped preserve the young university when it nearly closed in 1875 but was not considered a profound scientist. Aughey gathered thousands of insect specimens and tens of thousands of mineral samples, but proper cataloguing of the collection was limited. The museum moved to newly constructed Nebraska Hall in 1888.

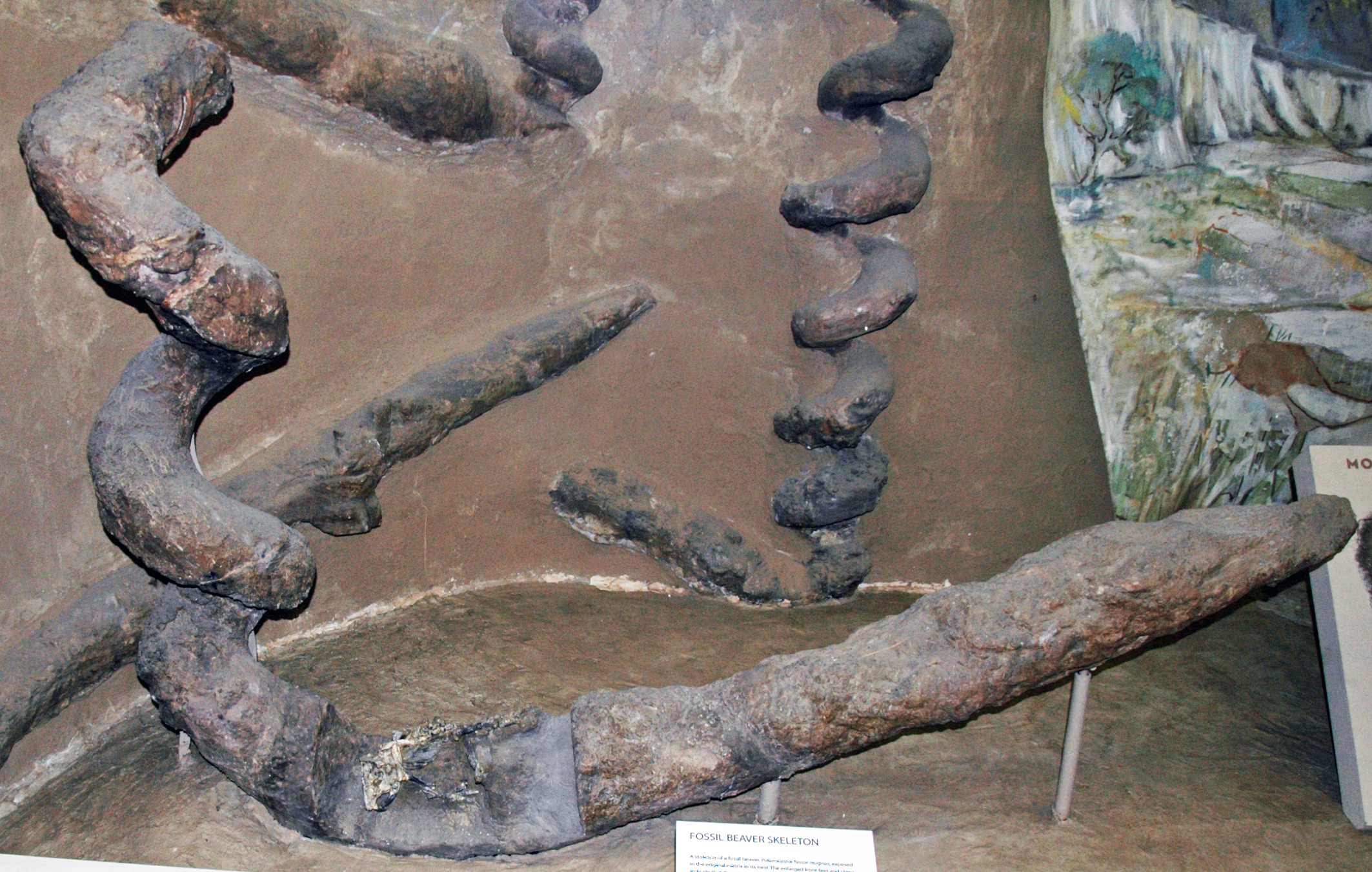
Daemonelix formations, discovered by Erwin Hinckley Barbour in 1891, are on display at the museum

Barbour became Chairman of the Department of Geology (and de facto museum director) in 1891 and immediately sought to expand the collection of fossil vertebrates; at the time, skeletons of a cow and a horse were the only large objects in the museum's possession. Barbour led an expedition to the Nebraska panhandle and unearthed a mysterious formation in the state badlands, a trace fossil he named Daemonelix ("the devil's corkscrew").

Barbour's discovery intrigued regent and donor Charles Henry Morrill, who gave $1,000 for another expedition when he learned Barbour's studies were not funded by the university. Morrill began sponsoring annual "Morrill Geological Expeditions," which greatly expanded the museum's collections. Barbour and university representatives presented his geological discoveries at the 1898 Trans-Mississippi Exposition. Barbour also began to gather the large mammoth and mastodon specimens for which the museum has become known. Morrill funded a new "Museum Building" in 1908 to house the rapidly expanding collection.

Morrill continued his contributions for the rest of his life, funding over one hundred archaeological expeditions. Shortly before his death in 1928, he implored chancellor Samuel Avery to establish a permanent home for the State Museum, as the Museum Building had fallen into disrepair after a 1912 fire. Avery hastily raised $300,000 for construction of a new museum, art, and music building, which was completed in 1927 just east of Memorial Stadium and dedicated as Morrill Hall. Its design was based on the European museums Barbour had toured during a 1909 trip.

=== Expansion ===
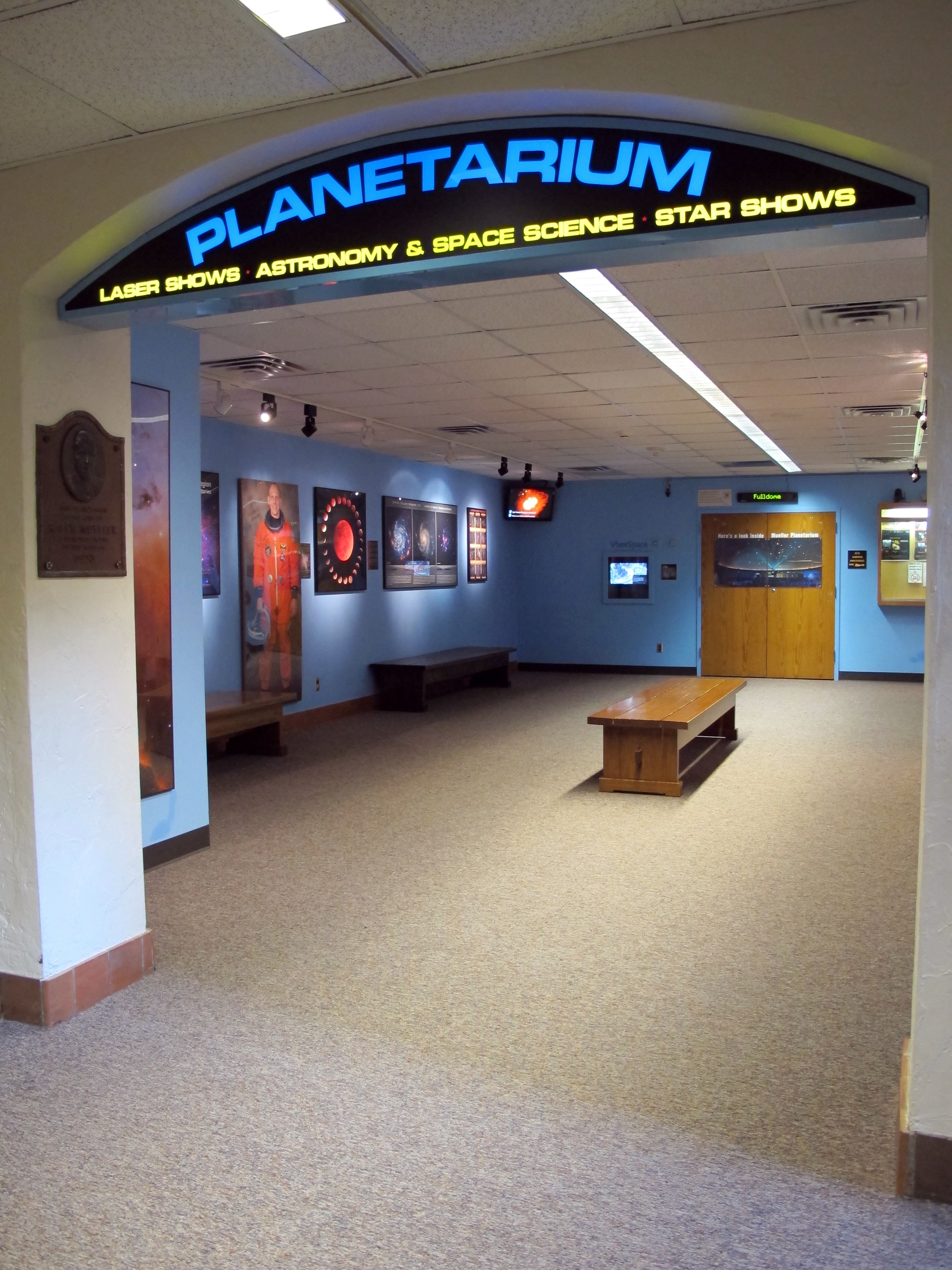
The Mueller Planetarium was established in 1958

With his health failing, Barbour retired as museum director in 1941 at age eighty-five. Assistant director C. Bertrand Schultz was promoted and worked to bring the university's collections of plants and insects, neglected during Barbour's tenure given his focus on large vertebrates, back under the museum's auspices. In the late 1950s, Schultz helped establish the Nebraska Hall of Wildlife, a series of dioramas depicting birds and animals in their native environments. Around the same time, university alumnus and Cleveland industrialist Ralph S. Mueller donated funds for what became the Mueller Planetarium, a thirty-one-foot dome that was the first planetarium in Nebraska. More than 20,000 people attended shows during its first six months of operation.

Toward the end of his thirty-two-year tenure as director, Schultz led a consolidation of the museum's collection. By 1970, the majority of artifacts were stored under the same roof for the first time in nearly one hundred years, with the exception of many large fossils which were kept in an off-campus storage facility.

Schultz's successor James H. Gunnerson led a dramatic reorganization of museum staff, hiring professional caretakers and greatly improving management of the collections. Members of the new staff noted a worsening deterioration of many fossils due to Morrill Hall's aging preservation systems. In June 1987, the Nebraska Legislature approved $3.7 million in funding for the renovation of Morrill Hall, including the addition of modern climate control to protect artifacts.

In 1998, a $275,000, life-size bronze mammoth statue – nicknamed "Archie," the same name given to the museum's largest fossil display – was erected in front of the museum's main entrance.

=== 21st century ===
In the early 2000s, sweeping budget cuts led by new chancellor Harvey Perlman eliminated several museum research positions and threatened its accreditation status with the American Alliance of Museums. A decision to close the Mueller Planetarium was later reversed.

The museum became a Smithsonian Affiliate in 2013, and permanently houses the Institute's scarab collection. Morrill Hall underwent a $9.3-million renovation in 2024 as the building prepared to celebrate its hundredth anniversary.

== Exhibits ==
=== First floor ===
Hall of Nebraska Wildlife

The Hall of Nebraska Wildlife is a collection of dioramas displaying animals, birds, and plants from different Nebraska regions. It includes an American bison (bison bison), a presumed descendant of the pre-Illinoian ice age bison antiquus, extinct since 4,000 to 5,000 years ago.

A mountain lion was added to the exhibit in 2008 after it was struck and killed on Interstate 80. Chemical analysis of the mountain lion's claws suggests it traveled from the Black Hills along the Missouri or Elkhorn Rivers. The exhibit also displays African animals on the Red List of Threatened Species, including the waterbuck (kobus ellipsiprymnus), a medium-sized antelope at lower risk, and the black rhinoceros (diceros bicornis), now critically endangered due to overhunting.

The Photo Ark

Morrill Hall houses the only permanent display of Joel Sartore's National Geographic The Photo Ark photograph series. Sartore, a Nebraska native, began the project in 2005 to document the world's biodiversity, hoping to photograph the approximately 15,000 living species in zoos, aquariums, and wildlife sanctuaries to encourage protection of wildlife. The exhibit uses videos and displays to showcase Sartore's techniques and interactive elements about the species and landscapes featured in the series.

A nearby display features Nebraska artist Elizabeth Honor Dolan, who was commissioned in 1926 to paint a series of fresco murals in Elephant Hall and adjacent galleries.

Marx Discovery Center

The Dr. Paul and Betty Marx Science Discovery Center offers a hands-on experience for elementary-aged children. It includes rhinoceros skeletons to be "uncovered," touchable fossils of mammals and plants, and information about the geology of Lincoln.

=== Second floor ===
Paleontology of Nebraska

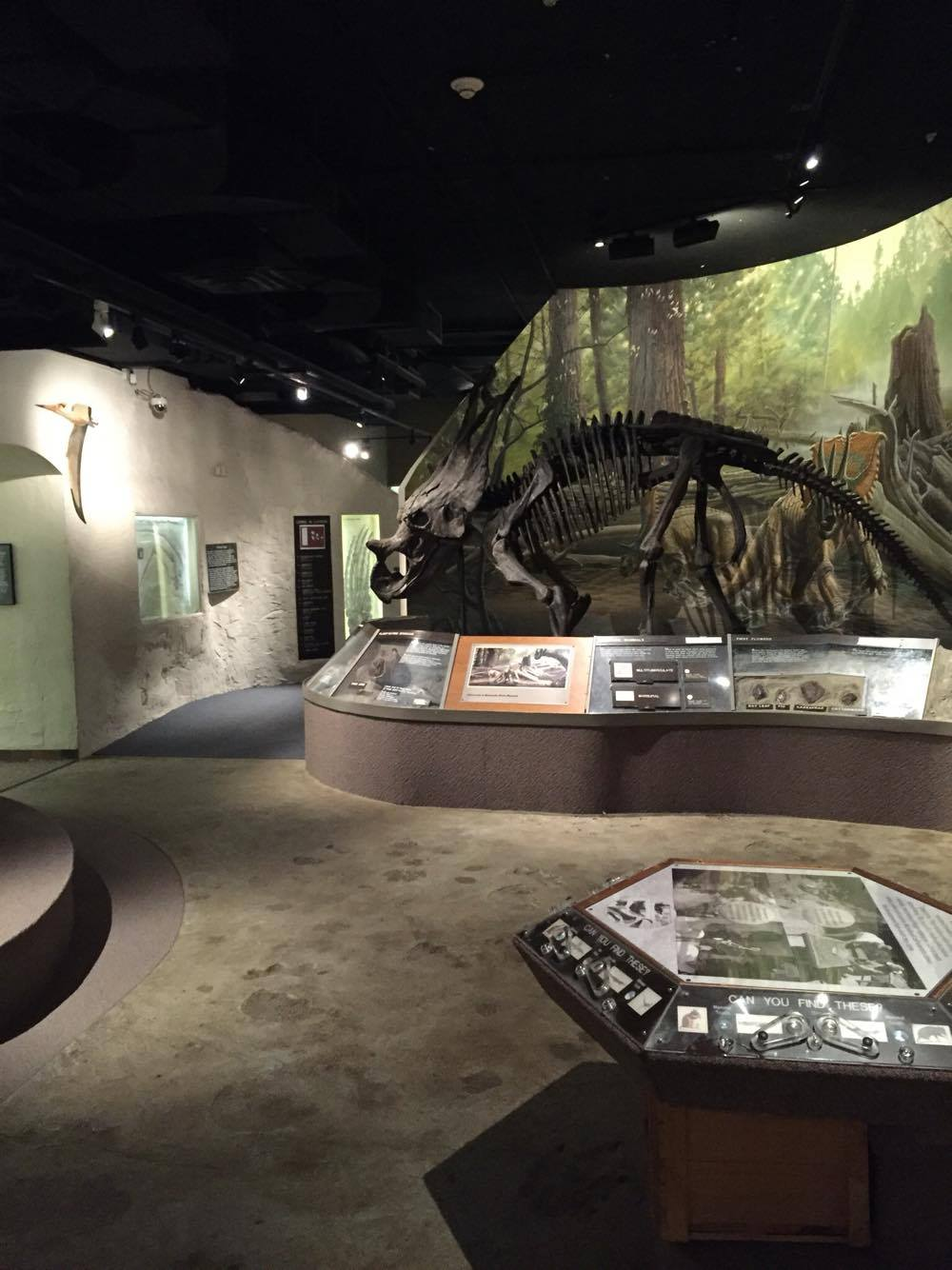
The Mesozoic Gallery

Located on the main floor of the State Museum as its centerpiece, the Paleontology of Nebraska exhibits include Elephant Hall, the Mesozoic Gallery, Fossil Animals, and the Toren Gallery of Ancient Life. The museum is known for its collection of over one million vertebrate fossils, fifth-largest in the United States, which it has gathered since Erwin Barbour began excavating in Western Nebraska in 1891. More than 85,000 vertebrate species have been cataloged, most originating from Nebraska, along with Pleistocene-era fossils from New Mexico and Cretaceous-era fossils from Montana.

Elephant Hall houses a large collection of mammoth skeletons, including the largest Columbian mammoth fossil in the world (known as "Archie"). Elephant Hall displays skeletons and models of various eras, highlighting changes in skeletal structure across thousands of years.

The Mesozoic Gallery features skeletons and models of species of the Mesozoic era. The gallery houses several dinosaur fossils, including a plesiosaur excavated in 2004 from Northeast Nebraska, one of the longest marine fossils in the world.

The Toren Gallery of Ancient Life includes models of organisms of the Paleozoic era. Fossil Animals displays skeletons of rhinoceros, horses, and camels, and typically houses new donations.

Mueller Planetarium

Mueller Planetarium was established in 1958 through a gift from alumnus Ralph S. Mueller. Director Jack Dunn hosted the planetarium's first laser light show in 1977, playing electronic music through a repurposed car speaker sound system with two slide projectors. When some audiences complained it was difficult to see the stars projected during laser shows, Dunn developed a show specifically tailored for visually impaired patrons. The project, promoted and shared internationally by the International Laser Display Association, used high-contrast dots and lines.

In 2006, the planetarium installed spherical mirrors to project shows onto the dome's thirty-foot roof. Dunn retired in 2014 but the Mueller Planetarium continued its laser light displays, along with informational shows depicting the Solar System and Nebraskan night skies.

Bizarre Beasts

Bizarre Beasts opened in 2013 to display strange and unusual prehistoric creatures. Artist and Nebraska native Gary Staab created the exhibit to provide a face-to-face look at these animals and discover how their environments shaped their features. The display showcases cast skeletons and life-size models of natural oddities, including a pterosaur, a giant reptile with a fifteen-foot wingspan; Diatryma, a six-foot-tall flightless bird; and Helicoprion, a thirteen-foot shark with a row of teeth that resembles a buzz saw.

=== Third floor ===
First Peoples of the Plains

Renovated and reopened in 1987, the First Peoples of the Plains gallery celebrates the traditions of Plains Indians. It features tools, clothing, and art from Indigenous tribes including the Omaha, Ponca, Iowa, Lakota, and Winnebago. The exhibit emphasizes how the vast Plains grasslands influenced cultural traditions, language, artistic expression, and religion of its tribes.

Arms, Armor, and Anthropology

The Arms, Armor, and Anthropology exhibit originally opened in October 2009 as Weapons Throughout Time. It reopened in June 2025, featuring over 150 weapons and pieces of armor, examining how cultural values, fighting tactics, and available resources contributed to differing weapon types and styles. The exhibit includes several full sets of armor, including Meiji-period Samurai armor, clubs, daggers and knives, swords, bows and arrows, and firearms.

Other exhibits

The Goliath exhibit focuses on the Goliath beetle (Goliathus), one of the largest insects on earth, and its role in the global ecosystem. It includes hundreds of specimens from the university's entomology collection.

The Explore Evolution exhibit opened in September 2005 to depict evolutionary concepts developed by scientists including Peter and Rosemary Grant, Svante Pääbo, and Philip Gingerich.

The Cooper Gallery is used for temporary exhibits. Since 2019, it has hosted "Sun, Earth, Universe," created by the National Informal STEM Education Network and NASA. The exhibit has interactive displays about Earth and the Solar System. It is primarily suited for young children, allowing the opportunity to build a model spacecraft, observe the scale of the Solar System, use the tools NASA employs to explore interstellar forces, and study the Artemis program.

=== Fourth floor ===
The fourth floor of the museum housed office space and was closed to guests for over fifty years. In 2019, it was renovated through $11.4 million in private donations and the Cherish Nebraska exhibit was opened. Seven galleries display Nebraska's natural heritage, as it looks today and how it looked in the past. The Science Exploration Zone contains microscopes to study smaller organisms, and the State Museum Science display shows how scientists collect and prepare specimens from the field. A space for visitors to meet with museum scientists was created.

== People ==
=== Directors ===
No.	Director	Tenure
1	Samuel Aughey	1874–1885
2	Lewis Ezra Hicks	1885–1891
3	Erwin Hinckley Barbour	1891–1941
4	C. Bertrand Shultz	1941–1973
5	James H. Gunnerson	1974–1982
Interim	Allen Griesemer	1982–1984
Interim	John Janovy	1984–1986
6	Hugh Genoways	1986–1994
7	James Estes	1995–2003
8	Priscilla Grew	2003–2015
9	Susan Weller	2015–present

=== Significant contributors ===
Year(s)	Contributor	Contribution
1871	Stephen F. Nuckolls	Mineral artifacts
1893–1941	Charles Henry Morrill	Funding for research, expeditions, and construction
1987	Nebraska Legislature	$3.7-million grant
1989–1992	National Science Foundation	$380,000 for renovation and the addition of an endangered species collection
2007–2012	National Institutes of Health	Grant to create a World of Viruses exhibit
2008	National Science Foundation	$480,000 for beetle research
2013	Claire M. Hubbard Foundation	$150,000 for educational endeavors, technology advancements, and youth programs

== Gallery ==
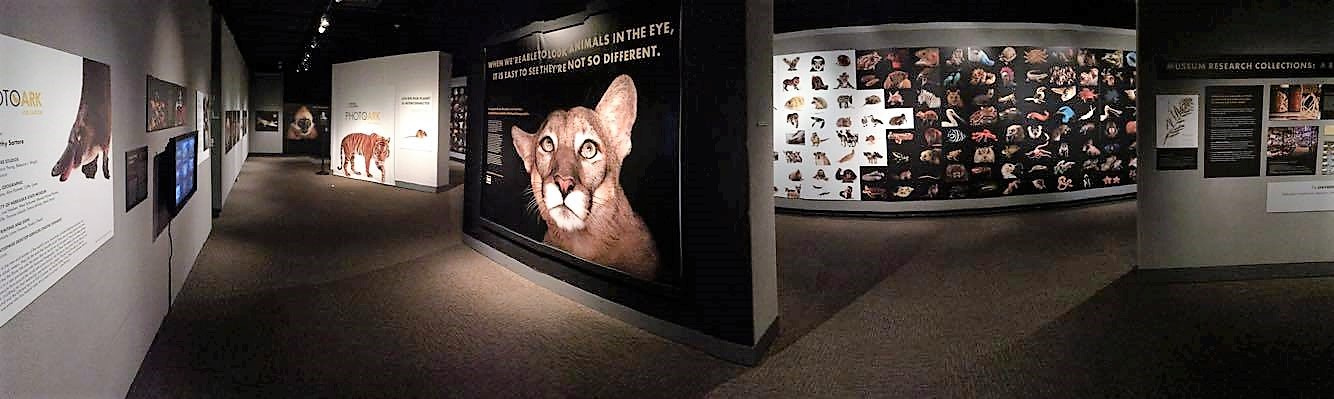
Animal evolution display

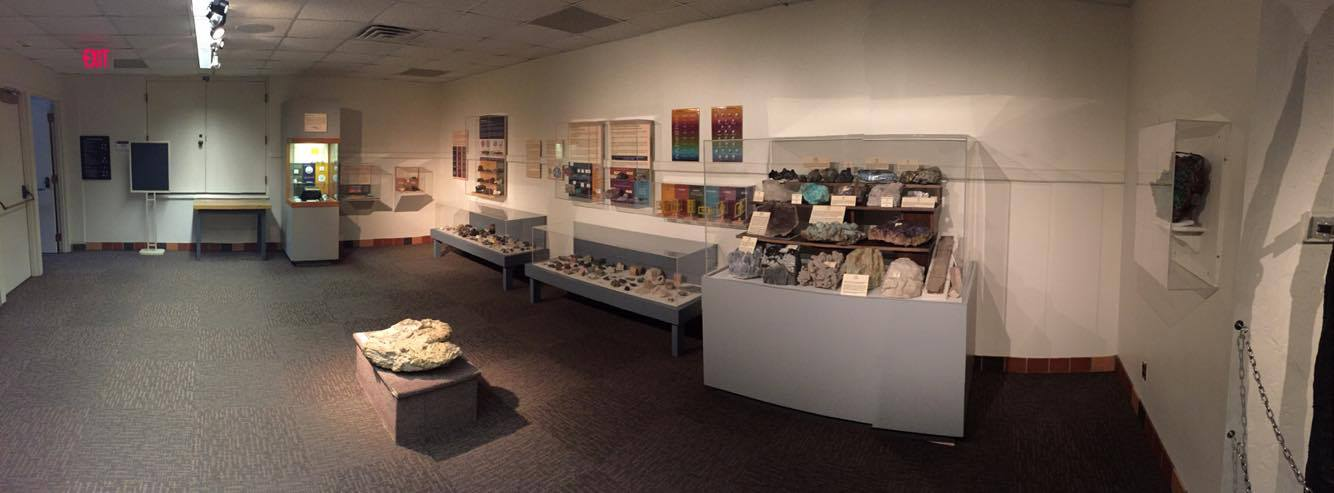
Fossil exhibit

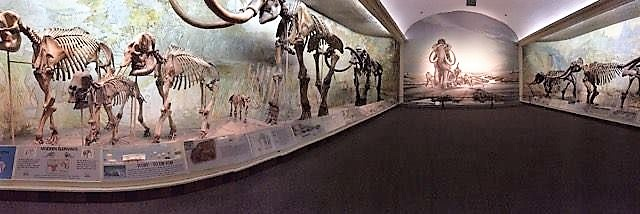
Elephant Hall, which includes the largest mammoth skeletons
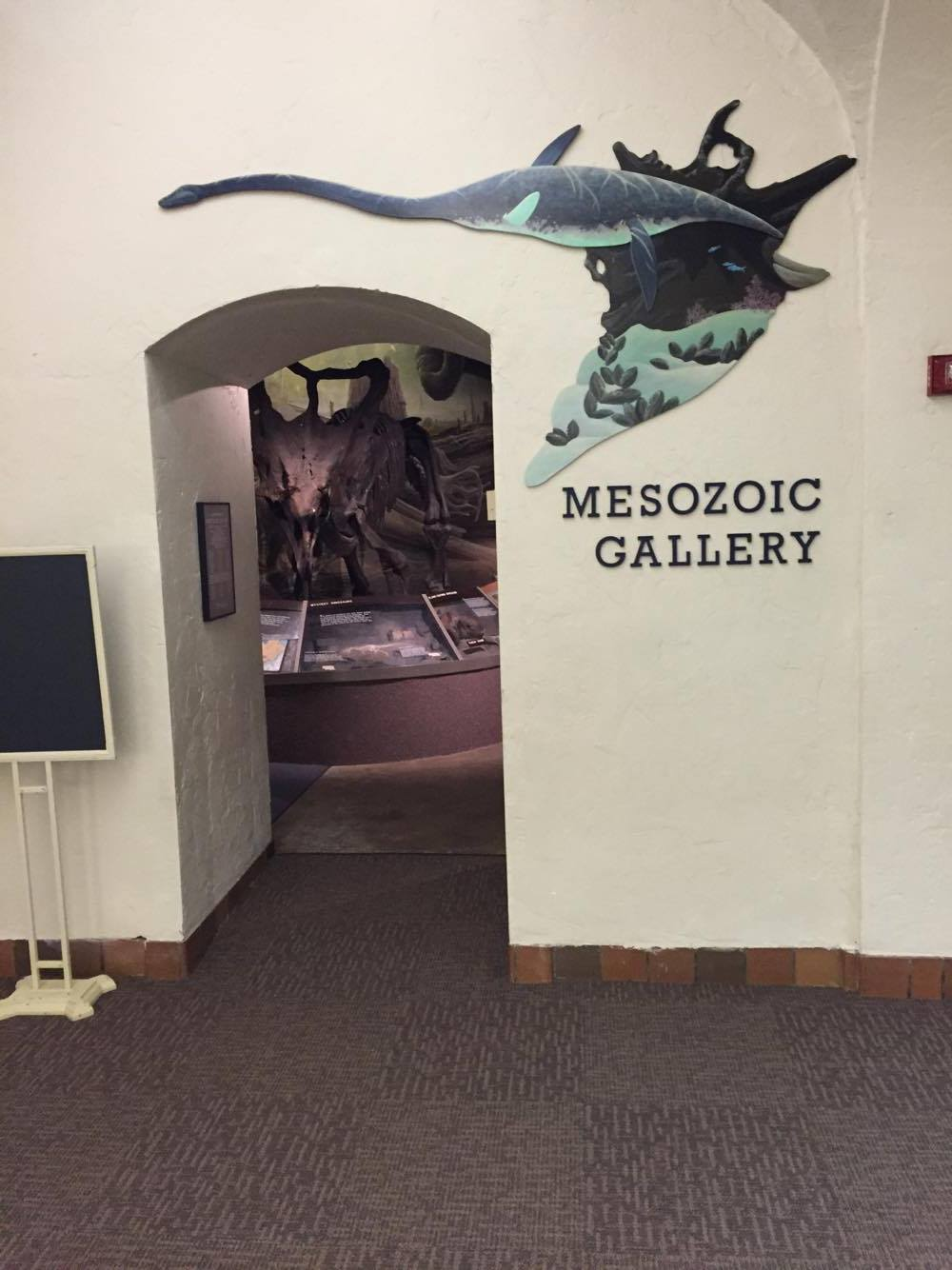
Entrance of Mesozoic Gallery

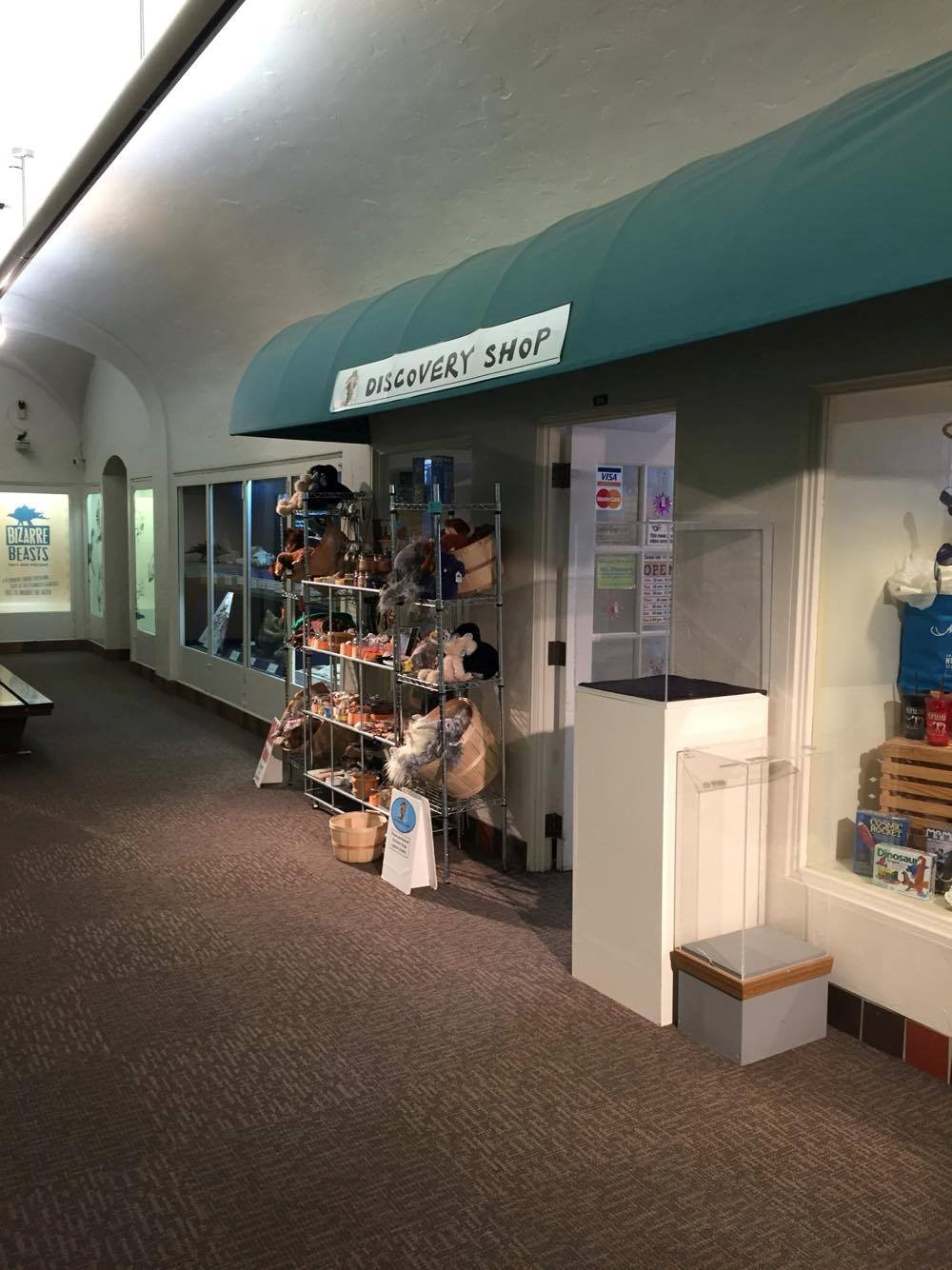
The Discovery Shop

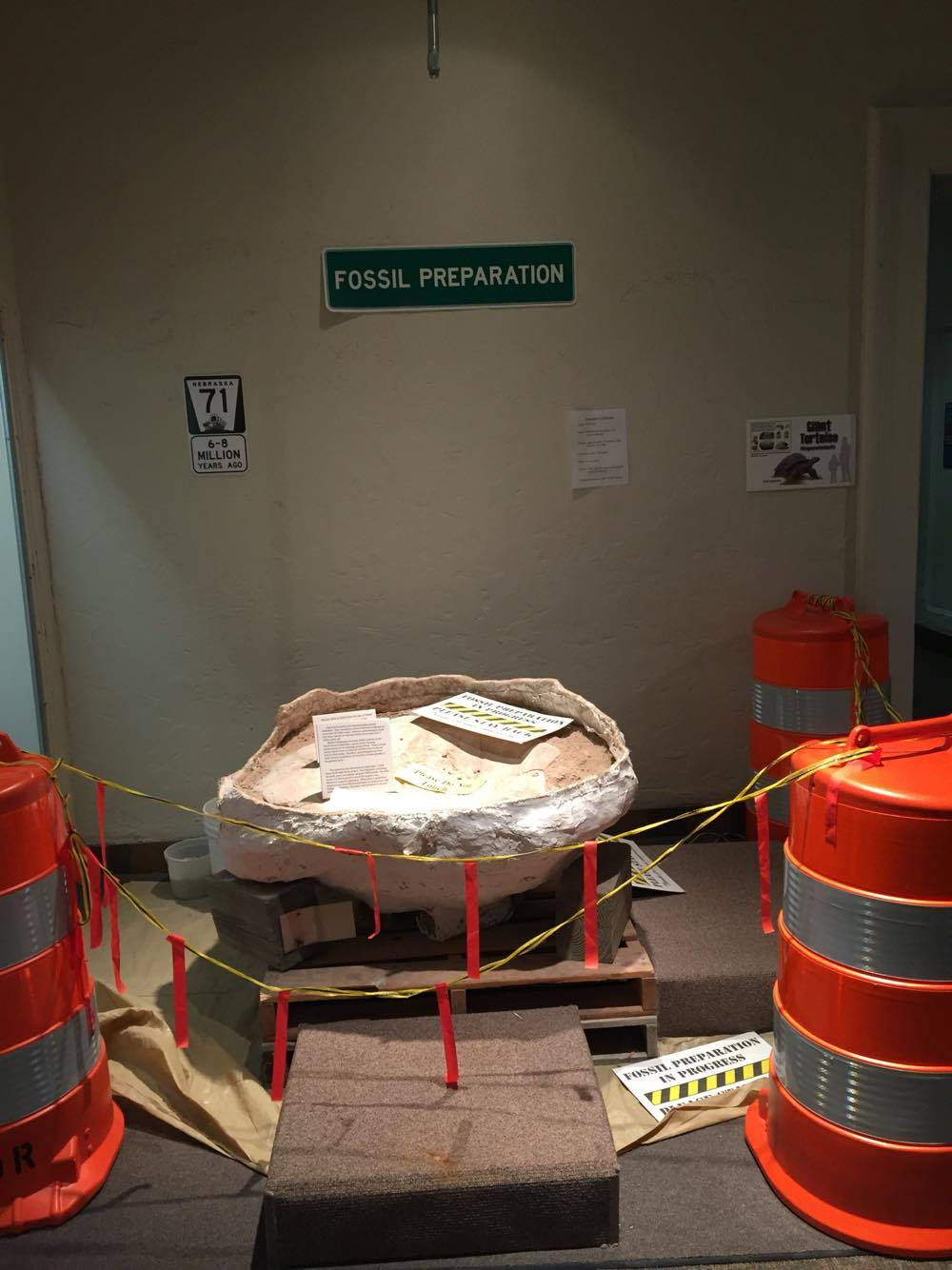
Fossil preparation

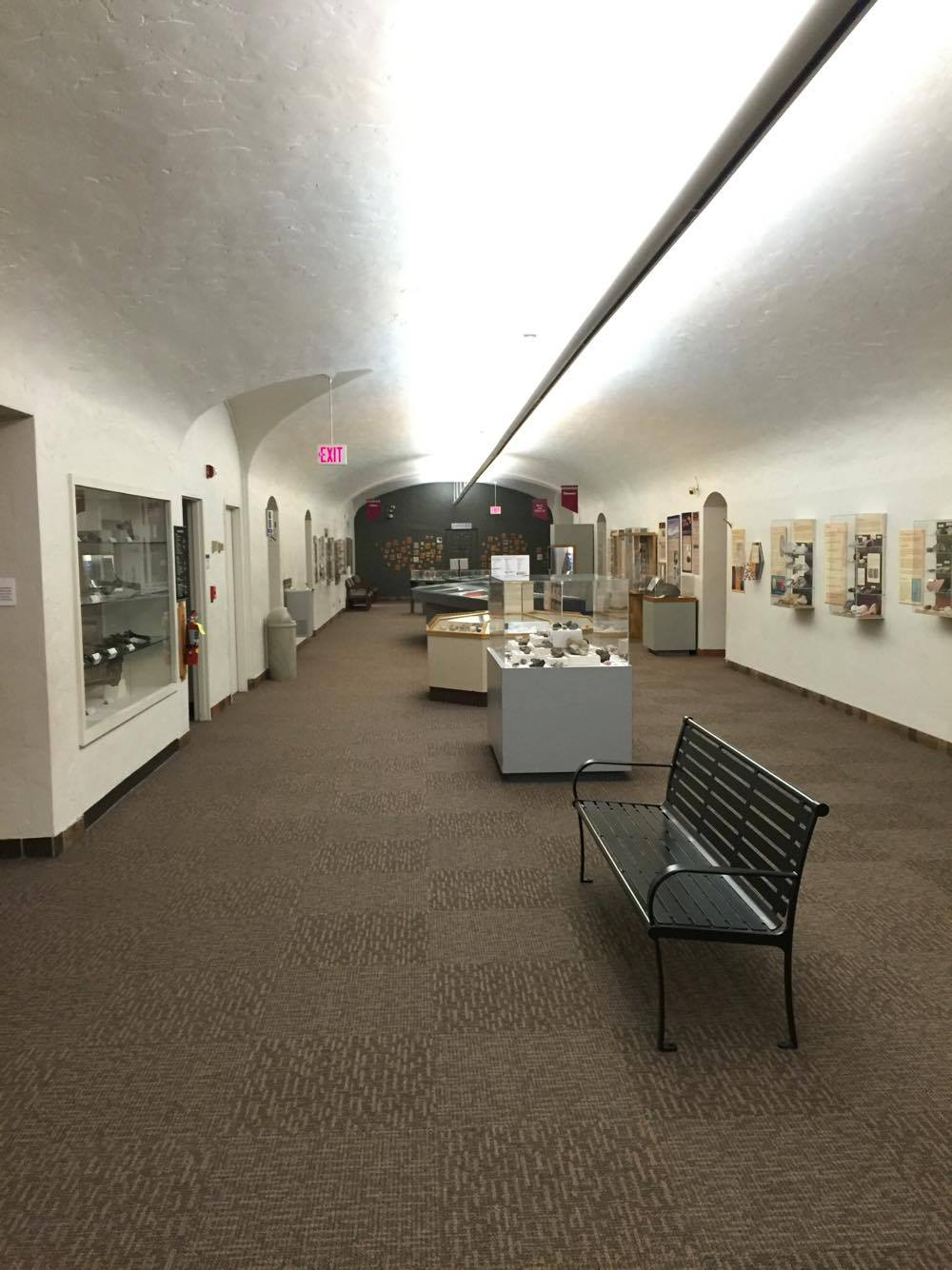
Second floor hallway

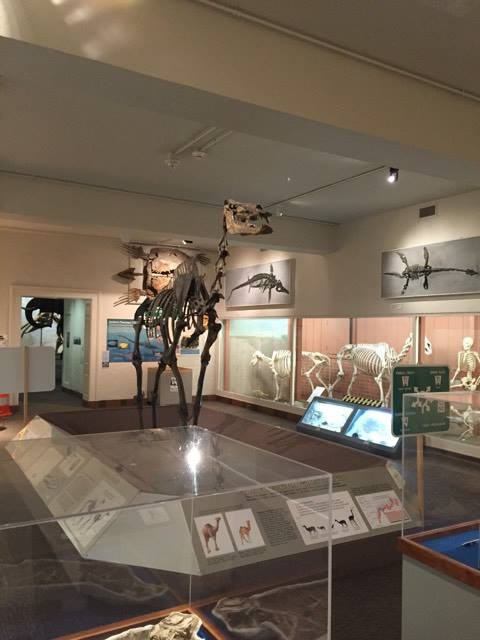
Vertebrate Paleontology Area on first floor

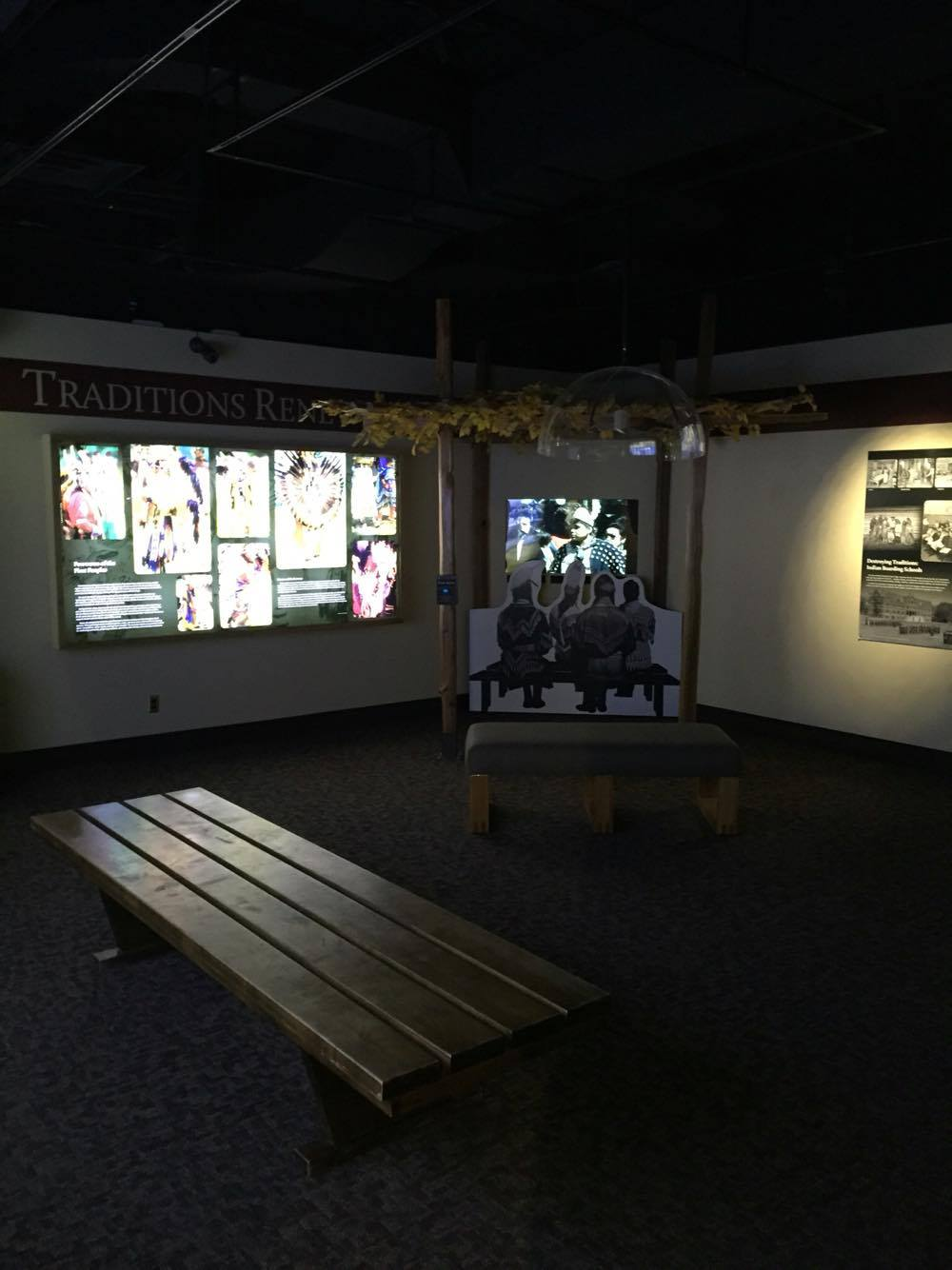
First Peoples of the Plains exhibit
