= Masonic Temple (Lincoln, Nebraska) =

- U.S. National Register of Historic Places
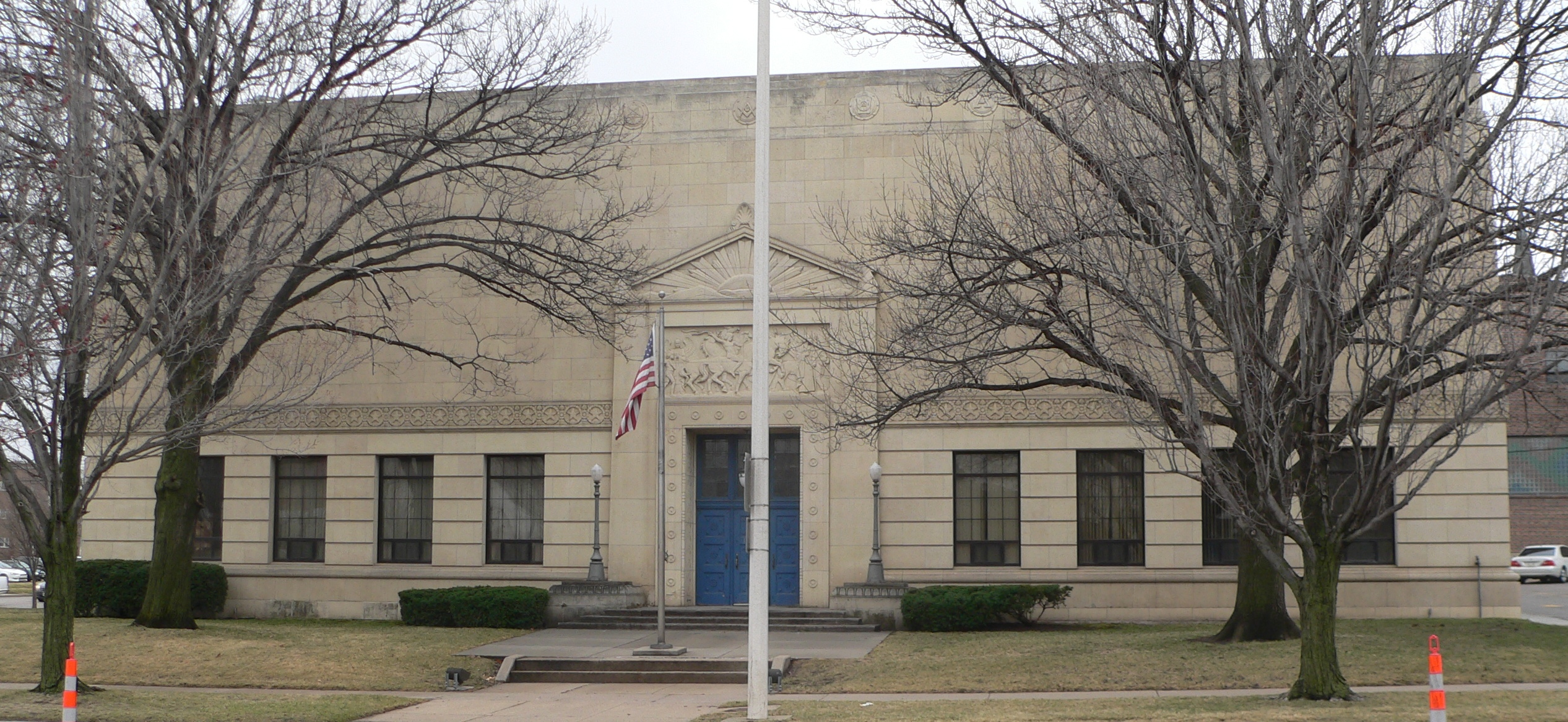
- Front (north side) of the Masonic Temple

- Location within Nebraska Location within the United States
- Location: 1635 L St., Lincoln, Nebraska
- Coordinates: 40°48′36″N 96°41′50″W
- Area: less than one acre
- Built: 1934-35
- Built by: Olson Construction Co.
- Architect: Meginnis and Schaumberg
- Architectural style: Art Deco
- NRHP reference No.: 05000792
- Added to NRHP: August 5, 2005

The Masonic Temple in Lincoln, Nebraska is a building from 1934. It was listed on the National Register of Historic Places in 2005.

It was designed by Lincoln architects Meginnis and Schaumberg in a restrained Art Deco style.

It is a three-story building and 78 by 112 feet (24 m × 34 m) in plan.
