= Charles Henry Morrill =

American businessman (1843–1928)

- Born: July 14, 1843; Concord, New Hampshire, United States
- Died: December 14, 1928 (aged 85); Stromsburg, Nebraska, United States

Charles Henry Morrill (July 14, 1843 – December 14, 1928) was an American businessman who played a role in the history of Nebraska. Morrill County, Nebraska, is named after him. He was born in Concord, New Hampshire, the only child of Ephraim and Mahala (Lampery) Morrill. His mother died when he was twelve, and he spent the remainder of his childhood living with his aunt Susan Gay and attending a nearby school, the New London Academy. In the summer of 1862 he enlisted at New London as a musician in Company I, 11th New Hampshire Volunteer Regiment. Three weeks later he married Harriet Zinnia Currier before leaving with his unit. He was present at many important battles, including the Battle of Fredericksburg and the Siege of Vicksburg and mustered out on June 4, 1865.

He states in his autobiography that after the war, he "took Horace Greeley's advice" (Go West, young man) and in 1866 went west in a covered wagon to establish a homestead near Marion, Iowa. Due to poor weather and being an inexperienced farmer, his crops failed for several years in a row. He was so poor he was unable to afford coffee. However, the weather and his fortunes turned around, and by 1870 he was producing both decent crop and a valuable herd of cattle.

In the spring of 1873, he moved his family of five and one hundred head of cattle to Stromsburg, Nebraska. There, he ran a farm and helped run a small store "with 6,000 Pawnee Indians less than 25 miles away."

== Business and politics ==
When his sons were old enough to help with the farm, Morrill started spending less time farming. In 1880, Morrill became private secretary to Governor Albinus Nance. After Nance completed his term as governor, they went into business together, forming the Bank of Stromsburg, Nebraska. He was afterwards President of the Lincoln (Nebraska) Land Company and also president of the South Platte Land Company, the Lancaster Land Company, and the Boston Investment Company.

Morrill eventually began helping the Burlington Railroad explore the midwest territories to report on conditions and determine the best routes for the railroads. He made a considerable amount of money buying land where the railroad line would eventually come, and selling it once the railroad line was built. He went on many exploration parties through largely Indian-controlled territory and acquired a large collection of American Indian artifacts through trading. One of his guides was Colonel W. F. Cody, Buffalo Bill, who helped him explore the Yosemite Valley in Wyoming on behalf of the railroad. For many years afterward, Morrill was invited on a yearly hunting expedition that Cody organized for his friends.

His exploration work helped Morrill to establish the location for what became Scottsbluff, Nebraska. Shortly thereafter, he laid out a tract of land for a town at the western edge of the state and named it after himself, thereby creating the town of Morrill, Nebraska. In the year 1908, the Nebraska State Legislature divided Cheyenne County, and the part north of the division line was named Morrill County, Nebraska, in recognition of Charles Henry Morrill's contribution to the development of this part of the state.

== Connection with University of Nebraska ==
Charles Henry Morrill became a member of the board of regents of University of Nebraska in 1890, and was president of the board between 1893 and 1903. Between 1890 and 1903, enrollment at the university grew from 300 to 3000.

While a regent, he was a strong benefactor, donating Morrill Hall. He also contributed funds for paleontological research under Dr. Erwin Hinckly Barbour, establishing the Morrill Geological Yearly Expeditions. The Expeditions populated the State Museum with a wide array of dinosaur and mammoth bones, and their finds were published in the volumes of the Nebraska Geological Survey. A new type of early American Indian arrowhead was discovered by the Expeditions and named a Morrill Point. Mr. Morrill collected thousands of American Indian specimens in the course of his dealings with the local tribes, and these were donated to the University Museum.
