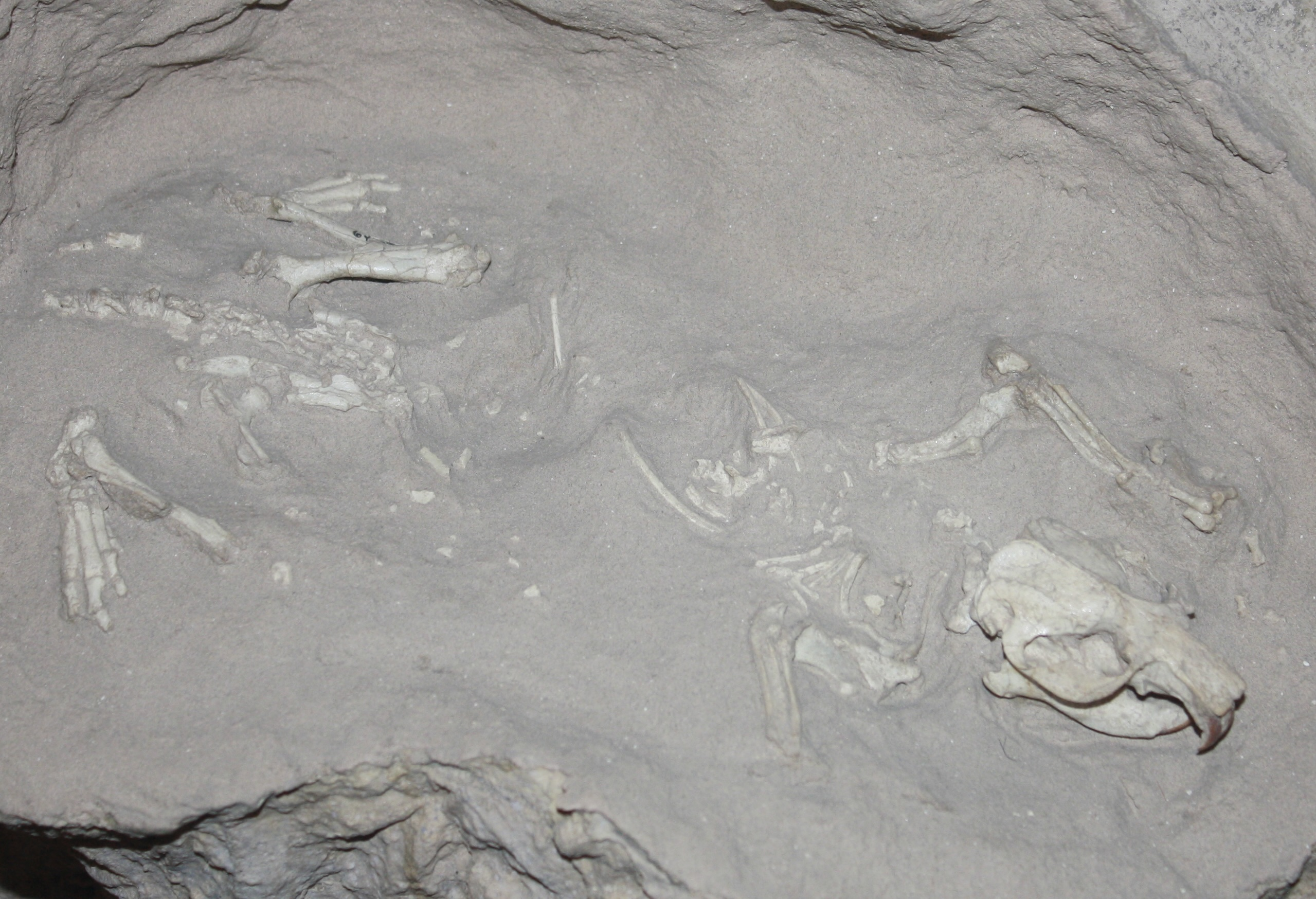
- P. fossor, collected in Wyoming. At the American Museum of Natural History

Scientific classification
- Kingdom: Animalia
- Phylum: Chordata
- Class: Mammalia
- Order: Rodentia
- Family: Castoridae
- Subfamily: †Palaeocastorinae
- Genus: †Palaeocastor; Leidy, 1869

Species
- †P. fossor; †P. peninsulatus

= Palaeocastor =

Palaeocastor Temporal range: Late Oligocene to Early Miocene, 29.5–18.5 Ma

Extinct genus of beavers

Palaeocastor ('ancient beaver') is an extinct genus of beavers that lived in the North American Badlands during the late Oligocene period to early Miocene, 29.5~18.5 million years ago. Palaeocastor was much smaller than modern beavers. There are several species including Palaeocastor fossor, Palaeocastor magnus, Palaeocastor wahlerti, and Palaeocastor peninsulatus. The animals first became known on grounds of their fossilized burrows, the "Devil's corkscrews."

== Biology ==
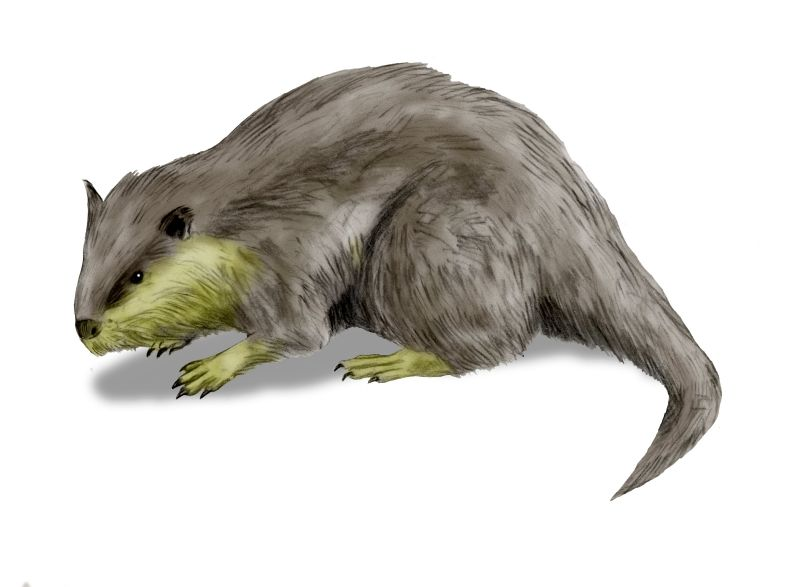
P. peninsulates

Some members of this genus made corkscrew-shaped burrows and tunnels. Like many early castorids, Palaeocastor was predominantly a burrowing animal instead of an aquatic animal.

Fossil evidence suggests they may have lived in family groups like modern beavers and employed a K reproductive strategy instead of the normal r-strategy of most rodents.

Based on size and habitat, Palaeocastor fossor has been compared to a black-tailed prairie dog (Cynomys ludovicianus).

== "Devil's corkscrews" ==
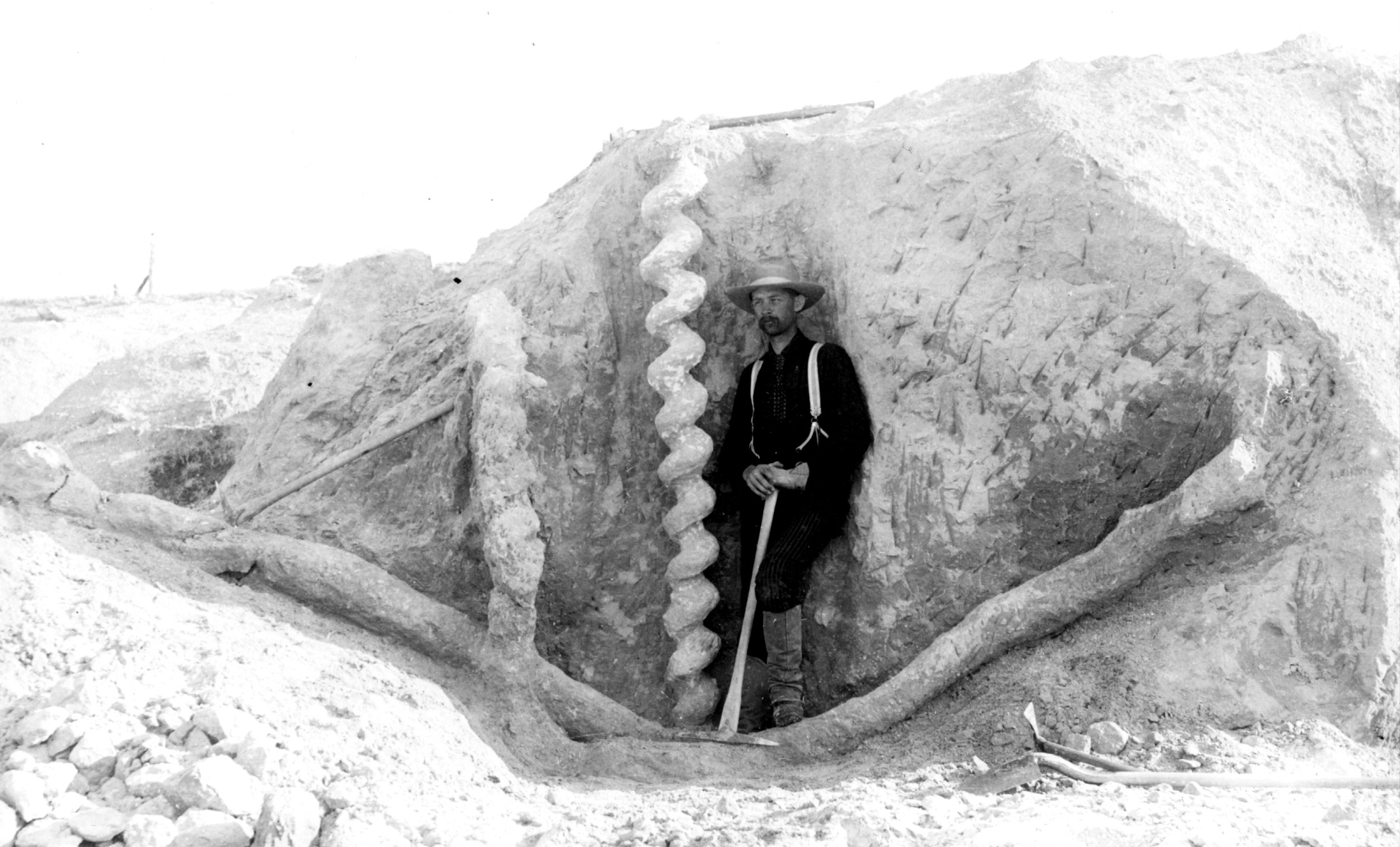
Daemonelix burrows, discovered in the late 19th century at Agate Fossil Beds National Monument. Standing next to it is the neuroanatomist Frederick C. Kenyon.

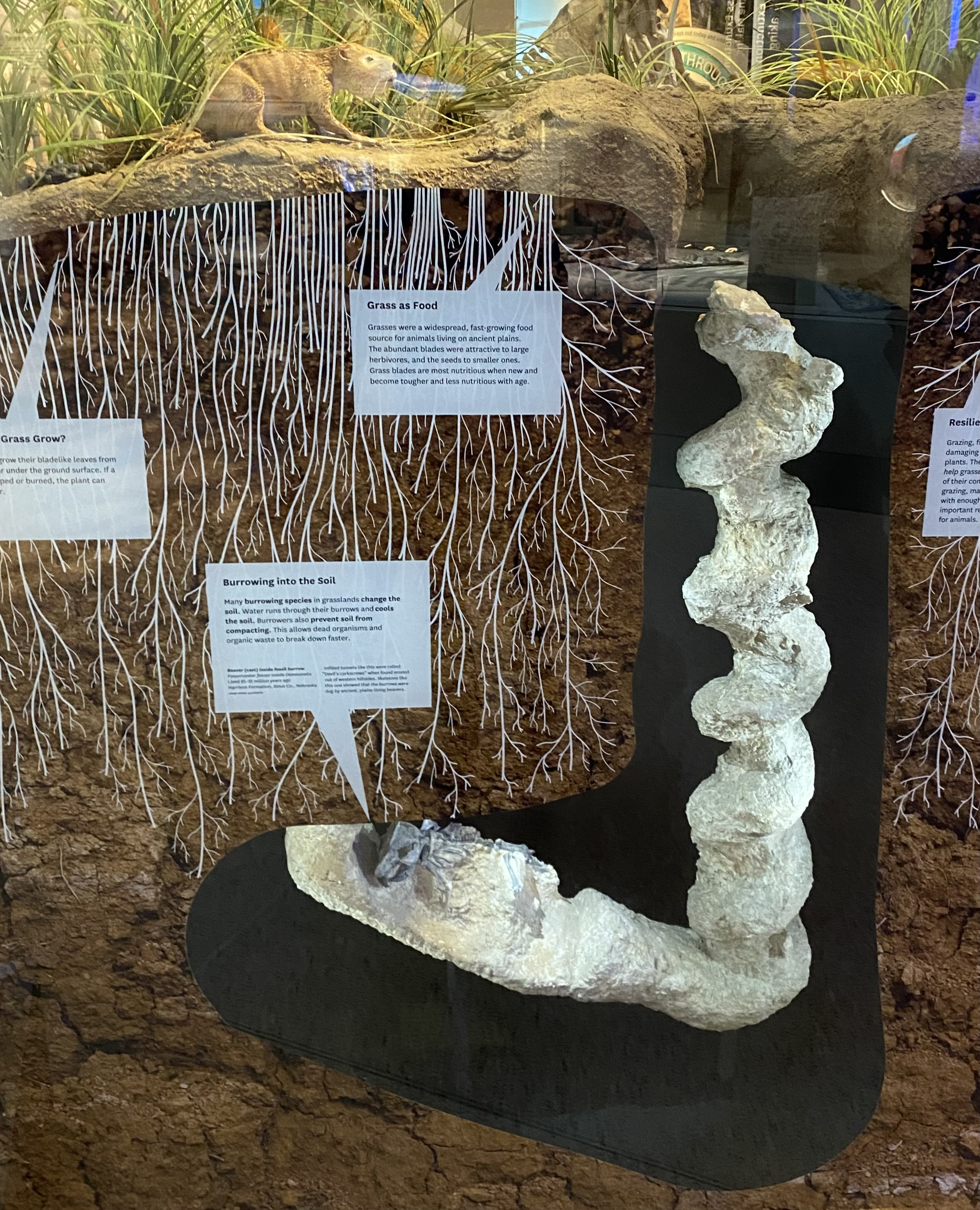
Burrow of Paleocastor fossor at the Smithsonian National Museum of Natural History

The discovery of Palaeocastor sprang from the discovery of "devil's corkscrews" in the plains of Sioux County, Nebraska, as a tree-sized, screw-like underground formation. Its basic form is an elongated spiral of hardened earth material that inserts into the soil as deep as 3 metres (9.8 ft). These puzzling structures first came to notice through Dr. Erwin Hinckley Barbour of the University of Nebraska around Harrison, Nebraska, in 1891 and 1892. Barbour then described them as giant freshwater sponges. This identification was influenced by the surroundings where the "screws" were situated; the deposits in which they occur were laid down in immense freshwater lakes in the Miocene Epoch, 20 million years ago. For a time, people tended to believe that the spiral forms were a curious type of extinct vegetation, although many remained skeptical.

In 1892, Dr. Barbour proposed that the devil's corkscrews were the burrows of large rodents, and Latinized the name to the ichnofossil name Daimonhelix, Daimonelix, or Daemonelix (all these spellings are found) and classified them by shape and size.

This does seem to contradict an essay by Barbour in the June 1895 volume of The American Naturalist. Here, Dr. Barbour attempts to refute a theory put forward by Dr. Theodor Fuchs, in which Fuchs states exactly that the Daemonelix was just the result of the burrowing of a Miocene gopher. In this essay, Barbour seems to be holding to the theory that the Daemonelix was the result of calcified plant forms. One argument put forward by Barbour was that the form of the corkscrew was too perfect to have been constructed by a "reasoning creature," and must instead have been the result of plant construction (or some other lower life form). Barbour also states in this essay that the discovery of a fossilized beaver was not proof of the origin of Daemonelix, as there has also been found the bones of "a mammal as large as a mouse."

In "The Curves of Life" (Constable 1914), Theodore Andrea Cook writes that "Other hypotheses have been put forward to explain these odd formations (i.e. the Daemonelix), one of the most likely being that two plants are involved, one of which coiled tightly round the other....it is clear that our knowledge is not yet sufficient to produce a theory that will satisfactorily explain the facts." Again, this suggests that the Devil's Corkscrew being the result of the burrowing of the Palaeocastor was not universally accepted in the scientific community as late as the second decade of the 20th century.

The dispute on its real identity ceased when a fossilized beaver was discovered in one of them. The scratches which were previously misinterpreted as claw marks are also strong evidence of the existence of Palaeocastor in contrast to modern Castor. In the early 1970s, Larry Martin and Deb Bennett studied many of the Devil's Corkscrews in the field and in the lab. Their research on Daimonelix, published in 1977, painted a completely new picture of these strange spiral structures and their origin.

Zodiolestes was most likely a predator of Palaeocastor as one fossil was found curled up in the "corkscrew" burrow.

They excavated their burrows with their incisors, not their claws. Recent research into why Palaeocastor fossor would have made helical burrows suggests that it was an adaptation leading to more consistent temperature and humidity level in the burrow as the climate became warmer and drier in the early Miocene.
