= Erwin Hinckley Barbour =

American geologist and paleontologist

Erwin H. Barbour
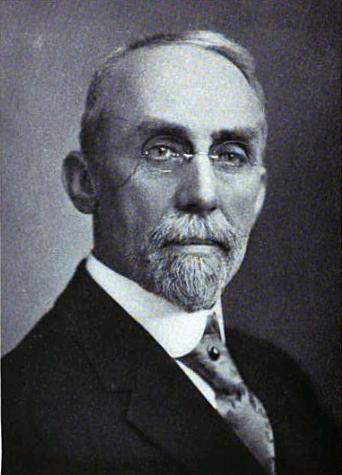
- Born: April 5, 1856; Oxford, Ohio
- Died: May 10, 1947 (aged 91); Lincoln, Nebraska
- Scientific career
- Fields: Geology; Paleontology
- Workplaces: United States Geological Survey; University of Nebraska

Erwin Hinckley Barbour (April 5, 1856 – May 10, 1947) was an American geologist and paleontologist.

He was born near Oxford, Ohio, and was educated at Miami University and at Yale, where he graduated in 1882. He was assistant paleontologist to the United States Geological Survey under Othniel Charles Marsh from 1882 to 1888. He then taught at the University of Iowa for two years, before being hired by the University of Nebraska in 1891 as head of the Department of Geology.

Upon his arrival at the University of Nebraska, he worked vigorously to equip his department and to start populating the University museum. Within a year, he was appointed Curator of the University of Nebraska State Museum. He remained the director until 1941. Also in 1891, he was appointed by Governor Thayer as Acting State Geologist, a position he also retained for many years.

Barbour gave his time for the next 25 summers to manage field parties throughout the state, surveying the geological and paleontological resources of the State of Nebraska. These trips were known as the Morrill Geological Expeditions, as they were funded by private donations from Charles Henry Morrill, regent of the University. Their reports were published in the volumes of the Nebraska Geological Survey, as well as the Report of the State Geologist. The specimens that were found were added to the collections of the University museum. As assistant curator of paleontology, his sister Carrie Adeline Barbour also participated in fieldwork and prepared specimens at the museum.

The genus Barbourofelis of false saber-toothed cats was named in his honor; the B. fricki holotype was found a few days after his death.
