= List of Graduate Women in Science members =

Graduate Women in Science formerly known as Sigma Delta Epsilon, is an international organization for women in science. It was established in 1921 at Cornell University in Ithaca, New York, United States as a women's fraternity. Following are some of its notable members. Membership includes graduate students in the sciences, alumnae, and honorary members. The latter are professional women who had achieved recognition in the science.

| Name | Chapter and year | Notability | Ref. |
|---|---|---|---|
| Isabella Abbott | Honorary, 2001 | Phycologist and ethnobotanist at Stanford University | |
| Ruth M. Addoms | | Botanist at Duke University | |
| Virginia Apgar | Honorary, 1971 | Physician, obstetrical anesthesiologist, medical researcher, and inventor of the Apgar score | |
| Beulah Armstrong | Gamma, 1924 | Mathematician and professor at the University of Illinois | |
| Carrie Adeline Barbour | Iota, 1927 | Assistant professor and assistant curator of paleontology at the University of Nebraska State Museum | |
| Lela Viola Barton | Honorary, 1964 | Botanist with the Boyce Thompson Institute for Plant Research | |
| Raven Baxter | Honorary, 2023 | Science communicator and STEM educator | |
| Emma Benn | | Biostatistician, professor, and dean at the Icahn School of Medicine at Mount Sinai | |
| May Berenbaum | Honorary, 2017 | Entomologist at the University of Illinois Urbana-Champaign | |
| Lynne Billard | Honorary, 1995 | Statistician and professor at the University of Georgia | |
| Katharine Burr Blodgett | Honorary, 1951 | Physicist and chemist with General Electric | |
| Louise Arner Boyd | Honorary, 1959 | Explorer of Greenland and the Arctic | |
| Hazel Branch | Alpha, 1921 | Entomologist and head of the Department of Zoology at Wichita State University | |
| Jean Brenchley | Honorary, 1986 | Microbiologist and professor at the Pennsylvania State University and Purdue University | |
| Mary Bunting | Honorary, 1963 | Microbiologist, geneticist, and president of Radcliffe College | |
| Margaret Burbidge | Honorary, 1985 | Observational astronomer and astrophysicist | |
| Helen Calkins | | Mathematician and professor at the Pennsylvania College for Women | |
| Margery C. Carlson | Honorary, 1978 | Botanist and a professor at Northwestern University | |
| Annie Jump Cannon | Honorary, 1931 | Astronomer who co-created the Harvard Classification Scheme, | |
| Margery C. Carlson | Honorary, 1978 | Botanist and professor at Northwestern University | |
| Emma P. Carr | Honorary, 1934 | Spectroscopist and chair of the chemistry department at Mount Holyoke College | |
| Marjorie Caserio | Honorary, 1980 | Chemist and professor at the University of California, Irvine and the University of California, San Diego | |
| Mary Agnes Chase | Honorary, 1963 | Botanist with the United States Department of Agriculture | |
| Martha E. Church | | Geographer and the first female president of Hood College | |
| Cornelia Clapp | Honorary, 1931 | Zoologist, specializing in marine biology. at the Marine Biological Laboratory | |
| Jewel Plummer Cobb | Honorary, 1988 | Biologist and president of California State University, Fullerton | |
| Teresa Cohen | | Mathematician and professor at Pennsylvania State University | |
| Nancy Cole | | Mathematician who contributed to Morse theory | |
| Rita R. Colwell | Honorary, 1987 | Environmental microbiologist | |
| Zada Mary Cooper | Honorary, 1963 | Pharmacist and a professor of pharmacy at the University of Iowa | |
| Kizzmekia Corbett | Honorary, 2023 | Assistant professor of immunology and infectious diseases at Harvard T.H. Chan School of Public Health | |
| Ethaline Hartge Cortelyou | Alpha | Chemist and scientific technical writer who worked on the Manhattan Project | |
| Martha Doan | Honorary, 1951 | Chemist and dean of women at Earlham College and Iowa Wesleyan College | |
| Mildred Dresselhaus | Honorary, 2016 | Physicist, materials scientist, nanotechnologist, and professor at the Massachusetts Institute of Technology | |
| Bernice Durand | | Physicist, professor, and vice provost at the University of Wisconsin–Madison | |
| Helen Dyer | Honorary, 1965 | Biochemist and cancer researcher | |
| Sylvia Earle | Honorary, 2008 | Marine biologist and oceanographer with the National Geographic and U.S. National Oceanic and Atmospheric Administration | |
| Sophia Eckerson | Honorary, 1941 | Botanist, microchemist, and department chair at the Boyce Thompson Institute for Plant Research | |
| Bernice Eddy | Honorary, 1967 | Virologist and epidemiologist at Northwestern University and Field Museum of Natural History | |
| Alice Catherine Evans | Honorary, 1931 | Senior bacteriologist at the National Institutes of Health | |
| Ruth Faden | Honorary, 2003 | Founder of the Johns Hopkins Berman Institute of Bioethics | |
| Margaret Clay Ferguson | Honorary, 1931 | Professor of botany and head of the department at Wellesley College | |
| Edith M. Flanigen | Honorary, 1994 | Chemist known for her work at Union Carbide | |
| Helen Murray Free | Honorary, 1994 | Chemist | |
| Aline Huke Frink | Nu, 1936 | Mathematician and professor at Pennsylvania State University | |
| Eloise Gerry | Honorary, 1956 | Research scientist with the U.S. Forest Service at the Forest Products Laboratory | |
| Lillian Moller Gilbreth | Honorary, 1949 | Psychologist, industrial engineer, and pioneer in applying psychology to time-and-motion studies | |
| Winifred Goldring | Honorary, 1966 | Paleontologist with the New York State Museum | |
| Mary L. Good | Honorary, 1988 | Inorganic chemist and Under Secretary for Technology in the US Department of Commerce | |
| Adele L. Grant | Alpha, 1921 | Botanist who taught at the Missouri Botanical Garden, Cornell University, the University of California, Los Angeles, and the Huguenot Faculty in Wellington, South Africa | |
| Esther Greisheimer | Honorary, 1973 | Academic and medical researcher | |
| Lois Wilfred Griffiths | | Mathematician and professor at Northwestern University | |
| Beatrice Hagen | | Mathematician and professor at Pennsylvania State University | |
| Alice Hamilton | Honorary, 1931 | Physician and toxicologist | |
| Laura Hare | | Medical doctor, naturalist, and conservationist | |
| Anna J. Harrison | Honorary, 1985 | Organic chemist and professor at Mount Holyoke College | |
| Helen Hart | Honorary, 1967 | Plant pathologist and professor at the University of Minnesota | |
| Janet W. Hartley | Honorary, 1980 | Virologist at the National Institute of Allergy and Infectious Diseases | |
| Mary Gertrude Haseman | | Mathematician known for her work in knot theory | |
| Edith Haynes | | Professor of microbiology at the Indiana University School of Medicine | |
| Nola Anderson Haynes | | Mathematician and professor at the University of Missouri | |
| Olive Hazlett | | Mathematician and researcher at the University of Illinois | |
| Marie Agnes Hinrichs | | Physiologist, zoologist, and professor at the University of Chicago, Southern Illinois University, and the University of Illinois | |
| Ariel Hollinshead | Honorary, 1977 | Cancer researcher and professor at George Washington University | |
| Elizabeth E. Hood | Honorary, 2019 | Plant geneticist and professor of agriculture at Arkansas State University | |
| Grace Hopper | Honorary, 1989 | Computer scientist, mathematician, and United States Navy rear admiral | |
| Nancy Hopkins | Honorary, 2006 | Molecular biologist and professor at the Massachusetts Institute of Technology. | |
| Hope E. Hopps | | Microbiologist and immunologist with the Food and Drug Administration | |
| Dorothy M. Horstmann | Honorary, 1973 | Epidemiologist, virologist, pediatrician, and professor at the Yale School of Medicine and the Yale School of Public Health | |
| Susan B. Horwitz | Honorary, 1995 | Computer scientist and academic | |
| Alice S. Huang | Honorary, 1989 | Biologist who specializes in microbiology and virology | |
| Barbara Iglewski | Honorary, 1988 | Professor of microbiology and immunology and director of international programs at the University of Rochester Medical Center | |
| Jedidah Isler | Honorary, 2018 | Professor of astrophysics at Dartmouth College | |
| Janina Jeff | | Geneticist and a senior scientist at Illumina | |
| Roberta Frances Johnson | | Mathematician and professor at Wilson College, Colorado State University, and the University of Colorado | |
| Vivian Annabelle Johnson | | Physicist and professor at Purdue University | |
| Madeleine M. Joullié | Honorary, 2011 | Organic chemist and professor at the University of Pennsylvania | |
| Frances Oldham Kelsey | Honorary, 1988 | Pharmacologist and physician with the U.S. Food and Drug Administration | |
| Mahin Khatami | Omicron | Program director and health scientist administrator at the National Cancer Institute, the National Institutes of Health (NIH), | |
| Ruth L. Kirschstein | Honorary, 2001 | Pathologist and director of the National Institute of General Medical Sciences | |
| Flemmie Pansy Kittrell | Honorary, 1976 | Nutritionist who was instrumental in creating the Head Start | |
| Mary Jeanne Kreek | Honorary, 1992 | Neurobiologist | |
| Lois Lampe | | Botanist and assistant professor at Ohio State University | |
| Rebecca Lancefield | Honorary, 1971 | Microbiologist with the Rockefeller Institute for Medical Research | |
| Mary Landers | | Mathematician who taught at Hunter College | |
| Jean Langenheim | Honorary, 2011 | Plant ecologist and ethnobotanist | |
| Hellen Linkswiler | Honorary, 1982 | Dietitian, nutrition scientist, and professor at the University of Wisconsin–Madison | |
| Marigold Linton | Honorary, 2018 | first Native American to earn a doctorate in psychology | |
| Mayme Logsdon | | Mathematician and professor at the University of Chicago | |
| Kathleen Lonsdale | Honorary, 1967 | Crystallographer | |
| Madge Macklin | Honorary, 1949 | Physician is known for her work in the field of medical genetics | |
| Lynne E. Maquat | | Professor of biochemistry, biophysics, pediatrics, and oncology at the University of Rochester Medical Center | |
| Barbara McClintock | Honorary, 1987 | Cytogeneticist who won the 1983 Nobel Prize in Physiology or Medicine | |
| Elizabeth McCoy | Honorary, 1973 | Microbiologist and professor at the University of Wisconsin–Madison | |
| Eula Davis McEwan | | Geologist and paleontologist who taught at the University of Nebraska | |
| Mary Alice McWhinnie | Honorary, 1974 | Biologist and professor at DePaul University | |
| Margaret Mead | Honorary, 1963 | Cultural anthropologist, author, and speaker | |
| Elizabeth C. Miller | Honorary, 1980 | Biochemist | |
| Nell I. Mondy | Honorary, 1986 | Biochemist and faculty of Cornell University | |
| Ethel Isabel Moody | Honorary, 1986 | Mathematician and professor at Pennsylvania State University | |
| Rosalind Morris | Honorary, 2011 | Professor of plant cytogenetics at the University of Nebraska–Lincoln | |
| Shruti Naik | Honorary, 2019 | Associate professor of pathology, dermatology, and medicine and associate director for the Colton Center for Autoimmunity at NYU Langone Health. | |
| Donna Nelson | Honorary, 2018 | Professor of chemistry at the University of Oklahoma | |
| Dorothy Virginia Nightingale | | Organic chemist and professor at the University of Missouri | |
| Yan Ning | Honorary, 2020 | Structural biologist and professor at Tsinghua University and Princeton University | |
| Ruth Sonntag Nussenzweig | Honorary, 1995 | Immunologist specializing in the development of malaria vaccines | |
| Ellen Ochoa | Honorary 2019 | NASA astronaut and former director of the Johnson Space Center. | |
| Helen Brewster Owens | | Mathematician, assistant professor at Penn State University, and suffragist | |
| Katherine Van Winkle Palmer | Alpha, 1921; Honorary, 1971 | Tertiary paleontologist and director of the Paleontological Research Institution | |
| Sophy Parfin | | Entomologist with the National Museum of Natural History | |
| Helen Parsons | Honorary, 1966 | Biochemist and nutritionist at the University of Wisconsin-Madison | |
| Edith Marion Patch | Honorary, 1941 | Entomologist and head of the entomology department at the University of Maine | |
| Eva J. Pell | Honorary, 2001 | Biologist, plant pathologist, and science administrator at Pennsylvania State University and the Smithsonian Institution | |
| Jeannette Piccard | Honorary, 1971 | High-altitude balloonist | |
| Margaret Pittman | Honorary, 1974 | Bacteriologist at the National Institutes of Health | |
| Dorothy Powelson | | Microbiologist and associate professor at Purdue University | |
| Jessie Isabelle Price | | Veterinary microbiologist at the National Wildlife Health Center | |
| Johnnie Hines Watts Prothro | | Nutritionist and chair of the Department of Home Economics and Food Administration at Tuskegee University | |
| Edith Quimby | Honorary, 1951 | Medical researcher, physicist, and one of the founders of nuclear medicine | |
| Adrienne Sophie Rayl | | Mathematician and University of Alabama Extension Center (now the University of Alabama at Birmingham) | |
| Elizabeth Wagner Reed | | Geneticist and one of the first scientists to work on Drosophila speciation | |
| Mina Rees | Honorary, 1971 | Head of the mathematics department of the Office of Naval Research | |
| Sally Ride | Honorary, 1989 | NASA astronaut and physicist | |
| Jane Sands Robb | Honorary, 1939 | Professor of pharmacology at State University of New York Upstate Medical University | |
| Mary Dora Rogick | Honorary, 1965 | Zoologist, professor and researcher at the College of New Rochelle | |
| Nina Roscher | Honorary, 1982 | Professor and chair of the chemistry department at American University | |
| Florence R. Sabin | Honorary, 1926 | First woman to hold a full professorship at Johns Hopkins School of Medicine and the first woman elected to the National Academy of Sciences | |
| Rosemary S. J. Schraer | Honorary, 1990 | Chancellor of the University of California, Riverside | |
| Florence B. Seibert | Honorary, 1943 | Biochemist who identified the active agent in the antigen tuberculin | |
| Mary Lura Sherrill | Honorary, 1950 | Chemical researcher and professor at Mount Holyoke College | |
| Patricia Silveyra | | Professor and chair of Environmental and Occupational Health at Indiana University School of Public Health | |
| Maxine Singer | Honorary, 1988 | Molecular biologist and administrator.of Carnegie Institution of Washington | |
| Maud Slye | Honorary 1931 | Pathologist at the University of Chicago | |
| Thressa Stadtman | Honorary, 1987 | Biochemist who discovered selenocysteine | |
| Anna Stafford | | Mathematician with the Institute for Advanced Study | |
| Ruth Stokes | | Mathematician, cryptologist, and astronomer | |
| Evelyn Butler Tilden | | Microbiologist at the National Institutes of Health and Northwestern University Dental School | |
| Marjorie Townsend | Honorary, 1995 | Electrical engineer and the first woman to manage a spacecraft launch for NASA | |
| Bertha Van Hoosen | Honorary, 1931 | Surgeon and founding president of the American Medical Women's Association | |
| Ellen Vitetta | Honorary, 1995 | Director of the Cancer Immunobiology Center at the University of Texas Southwestern Medical Center | |
| Lydia Villa-Komaroff | Honorary, 2001 | Molecular and cellular biologist | |
| Roxana Vivian | | Mathematics professor | |
| Joni Wallis | Honorary, 2023 | Neurophysiologist and professor at the University of California, Berkeley | |
| Evelyn J. Weber | | Biochemist, agronomist, and faculty of the Agronomy Department at the University of Illinois Urbana-Champaign | |
| Marion Webster | Honorary, 1970 | Biochemist who was the first to isolate the Vi antigen of typhoid | |
| Elizabeth Weisburger | Honorary, 1977 | Chemist with the National Cancer Institute | |
| Marie Johanna Weiss | | Mathematician, university professor, and textbook author | |
| Cynthia Westcott | Alpha | Plant pathologist, author, and contributor to The New York Times, House and Garden, and The American Home | |
| Anna Johnson Pell Wheeler | Honorary, 1931 | Mathematician and professor at Bryn Mawr College | |
| Anna Rachel Whiting | Honorary, 1965 | Geneticist | |
| Frances Wick | Honorary, 1934 | Physicist known for her studies on luminescence | |
| Evelyn Prescott Wiggin | | Mathematician and professor at Randolph-Macon Woman's College | |
| Mary Louisa Willard | Honorary, 1957 | Forensic scientist and professor at Pennsylvania State University | |
| Chien-Shiung Wu | Honorary, 1973 | Experimental physicist who worked on the Manhattan Project | |
| Emily Kathryn Wyant | Delta | Mathematician and founder of Kappa Mu Epsilon | |
| Rosalyn Sussman Yalow | Honorary, 1978 | Co-winner of the 1977 Nobel Prize in Physiology or Medicine | |

== See also ==
- List of Graduate Women in Science chapters
- Women in science
