= Ronald F. Czaja =

American sociologist

- Education: Wisconsin State University–Stevens Point (BS) University of Iowa (MA) University of Illinois at Chicago (PhD)
- Occupations: Survey research specialist, medical sociologist, academic
- Title: Associate Professor Emeritus

Ronald F. Czaja is an American sociologist and survey research expert. His areas of expertise include survey methodology, questionnaire design, public opinion research, and applied social science research. He has been an associate professor at North Carolina State University's Department of Sociology and Anthropology, and has since become Associate Professor Emeritus. He has also had positions as a visiting scholar at the Massey University (Palmerston North, New Zealand), College of Business Studies, Department of Marketing and as a statistician, Intergovernmental Personnel Act Assignment, Office of Research and Methodology, National Center for Health Statistics.

== Early life and education ==
Czaja obtained his Bachelor of Science in Sociology (Minor: Mathematics) from Wisconsin State University. He then went on to obtain a Master of Arts degree in sociology from the University of Iowa in 1969 with a thesis entitled ''Occupational Choice: A Study of Nursing''.

He then obtained his PhD in sociology at the University of Illinois at Chicago in 1976 with a dissertation entitled ''Social and Political Participation of Blacks and Whites in a Metropolitan Area: A Test of Three Perspectives''.

== Career ==
Czaja has worked at the Survey Research Laboratory at the University of Illinois at Chicago. In 1970, he worked as a research associate in sampling and as a project coordinator for six years. From 1977 to 1979, he was co-head of survey sampling section of this laboratory.

He was assistant director of the Survey Research Laboratory. At the same time he was employed as a professor of sociology, and adjunct assistant professor, Epidemiology-Biometry Program, School of Public Health, at the University of Illinois Health Sciences Center, Chicago.

In 1990, Czaja became an associate professor in the Department of Sociology and Anthropology at the North Carolina State University. His taught and conducted research into survey research methods, questionnaire design, public opinion research, and statistical applications in the social sciences. He later became Associate Professor Emeritus at the university.

Czaja was working on a Intergovernmental Personnel Act assignment as a statistician with the Office of Research and Methodology at the National Center for Health Statistics. He acts as a periodic reviewer for eight professional journals. He also acts as a proposal reviewer for and research consultant to fifteen separate government agencies.

He also served as an expert witness in Superior Court proceedings in Johnston County, North Carolina, in 1996 and 2013 in relation to change-of-venue motion hearings for the district attorney's office.

== Books ==
- Czaja, Ronald; Blair, Johnny (1996). Designing Surveys: A Guide to Decisions and Procedures. Thousand Oaks, California: Pine Forge Press.
- Blair, Johnny; Czaja, Ronald; Blair, Edward (2013). Designing Surveys: A Guide to Decisions and Procedures (3rd ed.). Los Angeles: Sage Publications.

== Refereed articles and chapters ==
- Tomaskovic-Devey, Donald; Wright, Cynthia Pfaff; Czaja, Ronald; Miller, Kirk (2006). "Self-Reports of Police Speeding Stops by Race: Results from the North Carolina Reverse Record Check Survey". Journal of Quantitative Criminology. 22 (4): 279–297. doi:10.1007/s10940-006-9012-0.
- Atkinson, Maxine; Czaja, Ronald; Brewster, Zachary (2006). "Integrating Sociological Research into Large Introductory Courses: Learning, Sociological Content and Research Techniques Together". Teaching Sociology. 34: 54–64. doi:10.1177/0092055X0603400105.
- Czaja, Ronald (2005). "Sampling with Probabilities Proportionate to Size". In Armitage, Peter; Colton, Theodore (eds.). The Encyclopedia of Biostatistics. Vol. 7. Chichester, United Kingdom: Wiley.
- Czaja, Ronald; Manfredi, Clara; Price, Jammie (2003). "The Determinants and Consequences of Information Seeking Among Cancer Patients". Journal of Health Communication. 8 (3): 213–228. doi:10.1080/10810730305684. PMID 12857652.
- Sherrard, M.; Czaja, Ronald (1999). Extending Two Cognitive Processing Scales for Use in a Health Intervention: Need for Cognition and Need for Evaluation. Vol. 4.
- Czaja, Ronald (1998). "Probability Proportional to Size Sampling". In Armitage, Peter; Colton, Theodore (eds.). The Encyclopedia of Biostatistics. Vol. 8. Chichester, United Kingdom: Wiley.
- Manfredi, Clara; Czaja, Ronald; Freels, Steven; Truitt, Margaret; Warnecke, Richard; Lacey, Linda (1998). "Improving Cancer Screening in Physician Practices Serving Low-Income and Minority Populations". Archives of Family Medicine. 7 (4): 329–337. doi:10.1001/archfami.7.4.329. PMID 9682686.
- Czaja, Ronald (1998). "Questionnaire Pretesting Comes of Age". Marketing Bulletin. 9: 52–66.
- Czaja, Ronald; Manfredi, Clara; Warnecke, Richard B. (1996). "Collecting Survey and Medical Records Data to Measure Intervention Outcomes in Medical Practices Serving Urban Minorities". In Warnecke, Richard B. (ed.). Health Survey Research Methods. Hyattsville, Maryland: National Center for Health Statistics.
- Parsons, J. A.; Warnecke, R. B.; Czaja, R. F.; Barnsley, J.; Kaluzny, A. (1994). "Factors Associated With Response Rates in a National Survey of Primary Care Physicians". Evaluation Review. 18 (6): 756–766. doi:10.1177/0193841X9401800607.
- Czaja, R. F.; Blair, J.; Bickard, B.; Eastman, E. (1994). "Respondent Strategies for Recall of Crime Victimization Incidents". Journal of Official Statistics. 10 (3): 257–276.
- Czaja, Ronald; McFall, Stephanie L.; Warnecke, Richard B.; Ford, Leslie; Kaluzny, Arnold D. (1994). "Preferences of Community Physicians for Cancer Screening Guidelines". Annals of Internal Medicine. 120 (7): 602–608. doi:10.7326/0003-4819-120-7-199404010-00012. PMID 8117000.
- Czaja, Ronald; Manfredi, Clara; Price, Jammie; Buis, Marianne; Janiszewski, Rosie (1993). "Cancer Patients' Search for Information: A Comparison of Patients Who Called the CIS and Other Cancer Patients". Journal of the National Cancer Institute. 14: 93–104.
- Manfredi, Clara; Czaja, Ronald; Buis, Marianne; Derk, David (1993). "Cancer Patients' Utilization of Treatment Related Information Received from the Cancer Information Service". Cancer. 71 (4): 1326–1337. doi:10.1002/1097-0142(19930215)71:4<1326::AID-CNCR2820710426>3.0.CO;2-K. PMID 8435809.
- Hoban, Thomas; Woodrum, Eric; Czaja, Ronald (1992). "Public Opposition to Genetic Engineering". Rural Sociology. 57 (4): 476–493. doi:10.1111/j.1549-0831.1992.tb00474.x. PMID 11654067.
- Czaja, Ronald F.; Trunzo, Deborah H.; Royston, Patricia N. (1992). "Response Effects in a Network Survey". Sociological Methods & Research. 20 (3): 340–366. doi:10.1177/0049124192020003004.
- Shaw, Debora; Czaja, Ronald (1992). "User Interactions with the PDQ Cancer Information System". Bulletin of the Medical Library Association. 80 (1): 29–35. PMC 225612. PMID 1537014.
- Czaja, Ronald; Blair, Johnny (1990). "Using Network Sampling in Crime Victimization Surveys". Journal of Quantitative Criminology. 6 (2): 185–206. doi:10.1007/BF01065850.
- Czaja, Ronald; Blair, Johnny (1988). "Using Network Sampling for Rare Populations: An Application to Local Crime Victimization Surveys". Proceedings of the American Statistical Association, Survey Research Methods Section. pp. 38–43.
- Czaja, Ronald F. (1987–1988). "Asking Sensitive Behavioral Questions in Telephone Interviews". International Quarterly of Community Health Education. 8 (1): 23–32. doi:10.2190/XT6W-31CX-TD87-E643. PMID 20841180.
- Czaja, Ronald F.; Snowden, Cecelia B.; Casady, Robert J. (1986). "Reporting Bias and Sampling Errors in a Survey of a Rare Population Using Multiplicity Counting Rules". Journal of the American Statistical Association. 81 (394): 411–419. doi:10.1080/01621459.1986.10478285.
- Czaja, Ronald; Warnecke, Richard; Eastman, Elizabeth; Royston, Patricia; Sirken, Monroe; Tuteur, Diane (1984). "Locating Patients with Rare Diseases Using Network Sampling: Frequency and Quality of Reporting". In Cannell, Charles F.; Groves, Robert M. (eds.). Health Survey Research Methods. Ann Arbor: Institute for Social Research. pp. 311–324.
- Snowden, Cecelia B.; Czaja, Ronald F. (1983). "An Evaluation of Counting Rules in a Network Survey: Estimating Prevalence Rates of Rare Events". Proceedings of the American Statistical Association, Survey Research Methods Section. pp. 102–105.
- Blair, Johnny; Czaja, Ronald (1982). "Locating a Special Population Using Random Digit Dialing". Public Opinion Quarterly. 46 (4): 585–590. doi:10.1086/268755.
- Czaja, Ronald; Blair, Johnny; Sebestik, Jutta P. (1982). "Respondent Selection in a Telephone Survey: A Comparison of Three Techniques". Journal of Marketing Research. 19 (3): 381–385. doi:10.1177/002224378201900312.
- Sirken, M.; Royston, P.; Bercini, D.; Czaja, R.; Eastman, E. (1981). "Completeness of Enumeration of Persons with Cancer in Health Surveys". Proceedings of the American Statistical Association, Social Statistics Section. pp. 223–227.
- Sirken, M.; Royston, P.; Warnecke, R.; Eastman, E.; Czaja, R.; Monsees, D. (1980). "Pilot of the National Cost of Cancer Care Survey". Proceedings of the American Statistical Association, Survey Research Methods Section. pp. 579–584.
