= Jessie Isabelle Price =

Veterinary microbiologist

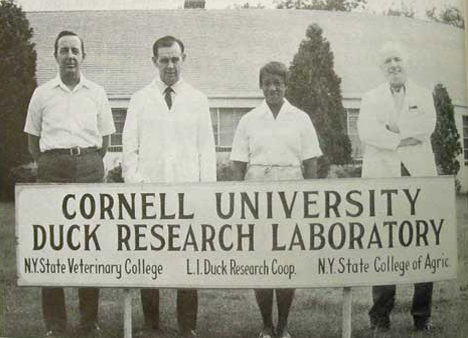
- Jessie Price and colleagues at the Duck Research Laboratory, Cornell University
- Born: January 1, 1930; Montrose, Pennsylvania, US
- Died: November 12, 2015 (aged 85); Madison, Wisconsin, US
- Education: Cornell University
- Known for: Isolating Pasteurella anatipestifer in white pekin ducks; Developing avian vaccines
- Scientific career
- Fields: Veterinary microbiologist
- Workplaces: Duck Research Laboratory Cornell University; National Wildlife Health Center, USGS

Jessie Isabelle Price (January 1, 1930 – November 12, 2015) was a veterinary microbiologist. She isolated and reproduced the cause of the most common life-threatening disease in duck farming in the 1950s and developed vaccines for this and other avian diseases. A graduate of Cornell University, where she gained a PhD (1959), she worked first at the Cornell Duck Research Laboratory and later at the USGS National Wildlife Health Center. She served as chair of the Predoctoral Minority Fellowship Ad Hoc Review Committee of the American Society for Microbiology (ASM), and as president of Graduate Women in Science.

== Early life and education ==
Jessie Price was born in Montrose, Pennsylvania. Her mother, Teresa Price, raised her daughter on her own in difficult financial circumstances. Price was the only African-American in her class, at a school where there were only two other Black students. After graduating from Montrose High School, she was accepted into Cornell University, moving with her mother to Ithaca to take advanced high classes in mathematics and English for a year. Tuition fees were waived because of her New York residency and grades. She wanted to be a physician, but could not because of the cost. Price gained a Bachelor of Science in the College of Agriculture in 1953.

Her mentor, Dorsey Bruner, recommended post-graduate studies, but finances prohibited it. Price worked for three years as a laboratory technician in the Poultry Disease Research Farm in the Veterinary College at Cornell to save for further study. She gained research assistant support for 1956 to 1959, gaining a Masters in 1958, and doctorate in 1959, supervised by Bruner. Her Master's thesis was "Morphological and Cultural Studies of Pleuropneumonia-like Organisms and Their Variants Isolated from Chickens".

For her doctoral dissertation, Price isolated and reproduced the bacterium, Pasteurella anatipestifer, in white pekin ("Long Island") ducklings infected with a disease that was a major killer among duck farmers at that time. Her dissertation was published by Cornell University in 1959.

== Career and later life ==
After her PhD, Price joined the Cornell Duck Research Laboratory, where she worked from 1959 to 1977, teaching at Long Island University, where she became an adjunct professor. She worked on developing a vaccine, undertaking trials of mixed flocks of vaccinated and unvaccinated ducklings, working every day, and conducting daily autopsies. In 1964, Ebony magazine featured Price and her work in an extensive photo-essay describing and showing her work on vaccine development, in the Duck Research Laboratory and on the farm. Price describes the heavy workload, made more onerous by the four-mile distance between the laboratory and farm where the flocks of ducklings were managed.

In 1966, Price was awarded a National Science Foundation travel grant to present her findings at the International Congress for Microbiology in Moscow. By 1974, she had developed an injectable vaccine and was moving on to studying oral vaccination. She moved to the USGS National Wildlife Health Center in Madison, Wisconsin in 1977, and the study of environmental contaminants and diseases in wildlife, especially water fowl.

Her professional activities included serving as chair of the Predoctoral Minority Fellowship Ad Hoc Review Committee of the American Society for Microbiology (ASM), as well as its Summer Research Fellowship and Travel Award Program. Price was also a member of the ASM's Committee on the Status of Minority Microbiologists and its Committee on the Status of Women Microbiologists. She was also active in Graduate Women in Science (also called Sigma Delta Epsilon), serving as national president from 1974 to 1975, after being national second vice-president (1972-1973), as well as on the national board of directors (1976-1980).

Price was a dog-lover and breeder, with a prize-winning Corgi in the 1960s. Her other favorite pastimes were photography, music, and travel.

Price died of Lewy body dementia on 12 November 2015 in Madison, and was buried in Quoque Cemetery on Long Island.

== Avian disease research and vaccine development ==
Long Island "New Duck Disease" is an infectious disease affecting primarily ducklings, with a high mortality rate. In 1956, the United States Department of Agriculture (USDA) reported that it was "the most important disease problem of the duck industry", with losses of up to 75% of populations. For her doctoral work, Price isolated and reproduced Pasteurella anatipestifer, an essential step for vaccine development.

While at the Cornell Duck Research Laboratory, she began working on vaccine development for Pasteurella anatipestifer for white pekin ducks, which she would continue in avian cholera and TB for various species through her career. Some of the vaccines were commercially developed. She worked with national and international colleagues, publishing on Pasteurella anatipestifer in pheasants, medication for bacterial infections in ducklings, Pasteurella multocida in Nebraska wetlands and in snow geese.
