= List of Graduate Women in Science chapters =

Graduate Women in Science, formerly known as Sigma Delta Epsilon, is an international organization for women in science. It was established in 1921 at Cornell University in Ithaca, New York, United States.

In the following list, active chapters are indicated in bold and inactive chapters are in italics.

Chapter	Former chapter name	Charter date	Institution	Location	Status	Ref.
Ithaca	Alpha	May 24, 1921 – 1990	Cornell University	Ithaca, New York	Inactive	
**Madison**	**Beta**	1922	University of Wisconsin–Madison	Madison, Wisconsin	Active	(Note: Chapter formed from a pre-existing local organization.)
	Gamma	1924–1976	University of Illinois	Champaign and Urbana, Illinois	Inactive	
	Delta	1924	University of Missouri	Columbia, Missouri	Inactive	
	Epsilon	1925–before 1991	Iowa State University	Ames, Iowa	Inactive	
**Richmond**	**Zeta**			Richmond, Virginia	Active	
**Chicago**	**Eta** (see Chi)	1925–before 1968; 2000	University of Chicago	Chicago, Illinois	Active	
	Theta	1927	Ohio State University	Columbus, Ohio	Inactive	
	Iota	May 18, 1927	University of Nebraska	Lincoln, Nebraska	Inactive	(Note: Chapter formed from the Graduate Women's Scientific Club (local).)
**New York City Metro**	**Kappa**	1928		New York City, New York	Active	
	Lambda (First)	1929–before 1970	Northwestern University	Evanston, Illinois	Inactive	
**Syracuse**	**Mu**	1933–before 1991; xxxx ?	Syracuse University	Syracuse, New York	Active	
**Hershey**	**Kappa Rho**	January 1936–xxxx ?; c. 2010	Penn State University College of Medicine	Hershey, Pennsylvania	Active	(Note: Chapter formed from the Women's Scientific Club, a local honorary group established in 1933.)
**State College**	**Nu**	1936	Pennsylvania State University	State College, Pennsylvania	Active	
**Twin Cities**	**Xi**	1945	University of Minnesota	Minneapolis and Saint Paul, Minnesota	Active	
**National Capital**	**Omicron**	1948		Washington, D.C.	Active	
	Pi	January 1949	Purdue University	West Lafayette, Indiana	Inactive	
**Philadelphia**	**Rho**	1951–xxxx ?; 2019		Philadelphia, Pennsylvania	Active	
**Mid-Michigan**	**Sigma**	1954–before 1991; xxxx ?	Michigan State University	East Lansing, Michigan	Active	
	Tau	1959	University of Southern California and Western Arizona	Los Angeles, California	Inactive	
	Upsilon	1959	Indiana University Bloomington	Bloomington, Indiana	Inactive	
	Phi	1968	University of Kansas	Lawrence, Kansas	Inactive	
	Chi (see Eta)	1968	University of Chicago	Chicago, Illinois		
**Chapter-at-Large**	**Omega**	1968	Chapter-at-Large		Active	(Note: Chapter consists of American and international members who do not live near one of the active local chapters.)
	Lambda (Second)	1970	California and Southwest United States	California		
	Psi	1976	University of Rochester	Rochester, New York	Inactive	
	Alpha Alpha			Burlington, Vermont	Inactive	
**Research Triangle**	**Rho Tau**	June 20, 2009		Raleigh, North Carolina	Active	
**International**	**Iota Nu**	March 10, 2013			Active	
**Iowa City**	**Iota Chi**	2014	University of Iowa	Iowa City, Iowa	Active	
**Los Angeles**		August 16, 2016		Los Angeles, California	Active	
**Arizona**		November 2018	University of Arizona College of Medicine – Phoenix	Phoenix, Arizona	Active	
**Nashville**		February 2019		Nashville, Tennessee	Active	
**Delaware**		2019	University of Delaware	Newark, Delaware	Active	
**Rolla**		c. 2019	Missouri University of Science and Technology	Rolla, Missouri	Active	
**West Liberty**		c. 2021		West Liberty, West Virginia	Active	
**Central Ohio**		2023	Ohio State University	Columbus, Ohio	Active	
**Auburn**	**Alpha Upsilon**		Auburn University	Auburn, Alabama	Active	
**Boston**	**Alpha Omega**			Boston, Massachusetts	Active	
**Austin**				Austin, Texas	Active	
**Black Hills**			South Dakota School of Mines and Technology	Rapid City, South Dakota	Active	
**Central Kentucky**				Kentucky	Active	
**Dallas**				Dallas, Texas	Active	
**Eastern North Carolina**	**Epsilon Chi**			Greenville, North Carolina	Active	
**Eastern South Dakota**	**Sigma Delta**			Sioux Falls, South Dakota	Active	
**Grand Forks**				Grand Forks, North Dakota	Active	
**Greater Maryland**				Maryland	Active	
**Hattiesburg**				Hattiesburg, Mississippi	Active	
**Hawaii**				Honolulu, Hawaii	Active	
**Milwaukee**				Milwaukee, Wisconsin	Active	
**Missoula**				Missoula, Montana	Active	
**New York Capital**				Albany, New York	Active	
**Northern Colorado**	**Sigma Omega Delta**		Colorado State University	Fort Collins, Colorado	Active	
Orange County				Orange County, California	Inactive	
**Pittsburgh**				Pittsburgh, Pennsylvania	Active	
**Puerto Rico**				Puerto Rico	Active	
**St. Louis**				St. Louis, Missouri	Active	
San Diego				San Diego, California	Inactive	
**Tuscaloosa**				Tuscaloosa, Alabama	Active	

== See also ==
- List of Graduate Women in Science members
