= Silveyra =

Silveyra is a Spanish surname. Notable people with the surname include:

- Luciana Silveyra (born 1976), Mexican actress
- Patricia Silveyra (born 1981), Argentine-American lung physiologist and professor
- Soledad Silveyra (born 1952), Argentine actress
