= Ethaline Hartge Cortelyou =

American chemist and scientific technical writer

- Born: 26 November 1909
- Died: 19 July 1997 (aged 87)
- Education: Alfred College (B.S. in Chemistry, 1932)
- Known for: signing the Szilárd petition; advocating for female chemists
- Spouse: Warren Cortelyou
- Scientific career
- Fields: chemistry; scientific technical writing and editing
- Workplaces: University of Chicago's Metallurgical Laboratory ("Met Lab"); Armour Research Foundation; National Aeronautics and Space Administration (NASA); National Institute of Arthritis and Metabolic Diseases

Ethaline Hartge Cortelyou (26 November 1909 – 19 July 1997) was an American chemist and scientific technical writer and editor who worked on the Manhattan Project at the University of Chicago's Metallurgical Laboratory ("Met Lab") and was one of 70 scientists to sign the 1945 Szilárd petition. She also was a strong advocate for female scientists, strongly criticizing unequal treatment of women by employers and arguing that underutilization of women was holding back the United States' scientific advancement.

== Early life and education ==
Ethaline was born Ethaline Hartge on 26 November 1909 in New Kingstown, Pennsylvania. She studied chemistry at Alfred College in New York and graduated with a bachelor's of science degree in chemistry in 1932.

== Career ==
Cortelyou worked as a teacher and chemist as well as a technical writer and editor at multiple government agencies, academic institutions, and industrial companies. She is best known for her position a junior chemist and technical editor at the University of Chicago's Metallurgical Laboratory ("Met Lab") during the Manhattan Project. In her role she helped prepare a classified table of isotopes, but she opposed dropping an atomic bomb on Japan.

She later worked at the Armour Research Foundation (now called the IIT Research Institute) for seven years as a technical editor and two years as a literary analyst and served as technical editor of the Atlantic Division of Aeorojet-General Corporation in Frederick, Maryland. She also worked at Argonne National Laboratory, the National Institute of Arthritis and Metabolic Diseases, and the National Aeronautics and Space Administration (NASA) where she was a "science information specialist."

In September 1948, Cortelyou helped organize a National Cooperative Undergraduate Research program to get undergraduate students more involved in chemistry research. She was appointed the program's secretary and editor of the catalog of projects.

She was an early member of the American Chemical Society (ACS)'s Division of Chemical Literature (DCL) and was one of their most active authors during the period 1943–1964. She served as editor of DCL's publication, Chemical Literature (now the Chemical Information Bulletin) in 1958 and from 1965 to spring of 1969. As of May 1959, she had written 40 publications in chemistry and technical writing, including book chapters and articles on the design of data tables and graphs.

Cortelyou organized and served as the first president of the Chicago Chapter the Association of Technical Writers and Editors (TWE) (TWE later merged with other organizations to form what is now the Society for Technical Communication). She was also involved in TWE leadership on the national level, serving on their executive committee and chairing their constitution and bylaws committee. Through her leadership roles, she helped assure that TWE was inclusive to women.

== Advocacy for female scientists ==
Early in her career, Cortelyou counseled women to take jobs in scientific technical editing and editing like she had, advising them that there would be less opposition from men in those positions than they'd encounter in more lab-based positions. She also pointed out the benefits of technical editing positions for women, including that they could be a good bridge job between college graduation and starting a family and were more flexible in terms of reentry after taking time off for childcare.

By 1958, however, she came to see such funneling of women into these positions as a "waste of talent" that was detrimental to the advancement of science. She became a strong advocate for changing scientific culture to better accommodate and support women, rather than making women take positions that made it easier to also be a mother and wife. In a June 1958 article she wrote for Chemical Bulletin, "Utilizing Chemical Womanpower to Combat the Alleged Shortage of Chemists," she argued that women should not be limited to such positions and criticized employers who avoided hiring women or treated them unequally to their male counterparts.

Cortelyou served as an officer of the women's scientific fraternity Sigma Delta Epsilon, and they selected her to give a speech at their annual All Women in Science Luncheon in December 1958. The luncheon was part of a "Conference on the Participation of Women in Science" held by groups including Sigma Delta Epsilon concurrent with the American Association for the Advancement of Science (AAAS)'s annual meeting. In her talk on "The Status of American Woman Scientists," which she gave in the wake of the Soviet Union's Sputnik successes, Cartelyou argued that part of the Soviet Union's scientific successes, could be linked to their inclusion of female scientists. She urged employers to better provide for their female workers by, among other things, offering maternity leave and part-time education and employment opportunities to aid in reentry into the field after taking time off for childcare. She also urged female scientists to support one another.

Cortelyou served as a founding member and treasurer of the National Council on the Participation of Women in Science, formed in March 1959 as an offshoot of the conference. The Council was short-lived because, despite getting startup funds from the American Association for the Advancement of Science (AAAS), their National Science Foundation (NSF) and National Institute of Health (NIH) grant proposals requesting funding for the creation of a center to help end discriminatory practices in employment and education of female scientists were rejected on "technical grounds." The group remade itself as the American Council of Women in Science and Cortelyou remained an active member, but this new group was short-lived as well.

== Personal life ==
Ethaline married Warren P. Cortelyou April 18, 1930. Warren Cortelyou served as chairman of Roosevelt University's Chemistry Department. They had a daughter named Marie. Ethaline died on 19 July 1997 in Colorado Springs.
