= Hazel Branch =

American entomologist (1886–1973)

Hazel E. Branch
- Born: October 1, 1886; Concordia, Kansas, US
- Died: August 24, 1973 (aged 86); Wichita, Kansas, US
- Occupations: College professor and administrator

Academic background
- Education: University of Kansas, BA English, 1908 University of Kansas, MA English, 1912 Cornell University, PhD. Entomology, 1921

Academic work
- Era: 1921–1956
- Discipline: Biology
- Sub-discipline: Zoology and Entomologist
- Institutions: Wichita State University

Hazel Elisabeth Branch (October 1, 1886 – August 24, 1973) was an American entomologist and academic. She was a professor and head of the Department of Zoology at Wichita State University. Branch was a fellow of the American Association for the Advancement of Science and the president of the Kansas Academy of Science.

== Early life ==
Branch was born on October 1, 1886, in Concordia, Kansas. She attended the public schools in Cawker City, Kansas and Beloit, Kansas. She attended the University of Kansas, where she received a Bachelor's degree in 1908 and a Master's degree in English in 1912. She was a member of Phi Beta Kappa.

She received a Ph.D. in entomology from Cornell University in 1921. While at Cornell, she was a founding member and treasurer of Sigma Delta Epsilon (now Graduate Women in Science).

== Career ==
After graduating from the University of Kansas, Branch was a teacher and preceptress at the College of the Sisters of Bethany in Topeka, Kansas. She taught at Cornell University from 1921 to 1922, after receiving her Ph.D.

In 1922, Branch joined Fairmount College (later renamed Wichita State University), as a professor and head of the Department of Biology. In 1927, she became a professor and head of the Department of Zoology. Her research focused on preventative medicine, show the need for a balanced diet and the negative effects of alcohol and nicotine. She also studied pollution caused by dumping raw milk in streams and the negative impact of nicotine on rat reproduction.

Many of her students majored in pre-medicine. 197 of her students became physicians, 56 became dentists, 22 became nurses, and one became a phytopathologist. She sponsored the Pi Kappa Psi sorority at Fairmount College in 1938. She also organized Phi Beta Kappa at Wichita State.

She retired as a professor emeritus of zoology in 1956. After retiring, she turned to writing and published a scientific book about salamanders in 1959.

Branch was included in the 1938 edition of Men of Science. Branch was a fellow of the American Association for the Advancement of Science. She was a member of the American Society of Zoologists, the Academy for the Advancement of Science, and the Entomological Society of America. Branch was also the president of the Kansas Academy of Science and president of the Wichita chapter of the American Association of University Professors.

== Personal life ==
Branch lived at 3756 E. Douglas in Wichita, Kansas. She was active in the Wichita Science Club for local science teachers and the Junior Committee of the Kansas Academy of Science. She received the Alumni Recognition Award in 1957. She was a member of the St. James Episcopal Church in Wichita.

Branch died on August 24, 1973, in Wichita. In 1975, the Hazel Branch Endowed Scholarship at Wichita State University was established from her estate, and awarded to students majoring in biology with the intent to attend a medical school.

== Publications ==
=== Books ===
- Branch, Hazel E. A laboratory manual of Cryptobranchus aleganiensis Daudin. Vantage Press. 1959.

=== Journals ===
- Branch, Hazel Elizabeth (1913). Morphology and biology of the Membracidae of Kansas. Vol. 8, Series No. 3. University of Kansas.
- Branch, Hazel Elizabeth (1922). "A contribution to the knowledge of the internal anatomy of Trichoptera". Annals of the Entomological Society of America. 15 (3): 256–275. doi:10.1093/aesa/15.3.256.
- Branch, Hazel Elizabeth (1923). "Description of the early stages of Tanytarsus fatigans JOH". Entomologists News. 34: 1–4.
- Branch, Hazel E. (1922). "A new record relative to the parasites of Pholus achemon Drury". Transactions of the Kansas Academy of Science. 31: 100. doi:10.2307/3624128. JSTOR 3624128.
- Branch, Hazel E. (1922). "Notes on the Chironomidae of Kansas". Transactions of the Kansas Academy of Science. 31: 48. doi:10.2307/3624108. JSTOR 3624108.
- Branch, Hazel Elisabeth (1923). "The life history of Chironomus cristatus Fabr. with descriptions of the species". Journal of the New York Entomological Society. 31 (1): 15–30. JSTOR 25003980.
- Branch, Hazel Elisabeth (1928). "Description and identification of some Chironomid egg masses". Annals of the Entomological Society of America. 21 (4): 566–570. doi:10.1093/aesa/21.4.566.
- Branch, Hazel Elisabeth (1931). "The aims and opportunities of the Junior Academy in Kansas". Transactions of the Kansas Academy of Science. 34: 27–32. doi:10.2307/3624463. JSTOR 3624463.
- Branch, Hazel Elisabeth (1931). "Identification of Chironomid egg masses II". Transactions of the Kansas Academy of Science. 34: 151–157. doi:10.2307/3624485. JSTOR 3624485.
- Branch, Hazel Elisabeth (1931). "Effects of alcohol on the reproductive powers of rats (albino)". Transactions of the Kansas Academy of Science. 34: 311–313. doi:10.2307/3624508. JSTOR 3624508.
- Branch, Hazel Elisabeth; Moss, W. Glen (1938). "Effects of nicotine on rats (albino)". Transactions of the Kansas Academy of Science. 41: 317–329. JSTOR 3625263.
- Branch, Hazel E. (1942). "That the blind may see". The American Biology Teacher. 5 (2): 34–36. doi:10.2307/4437328. JSTOR 4437328.
