= Larry R. Ellis =

United States Army general

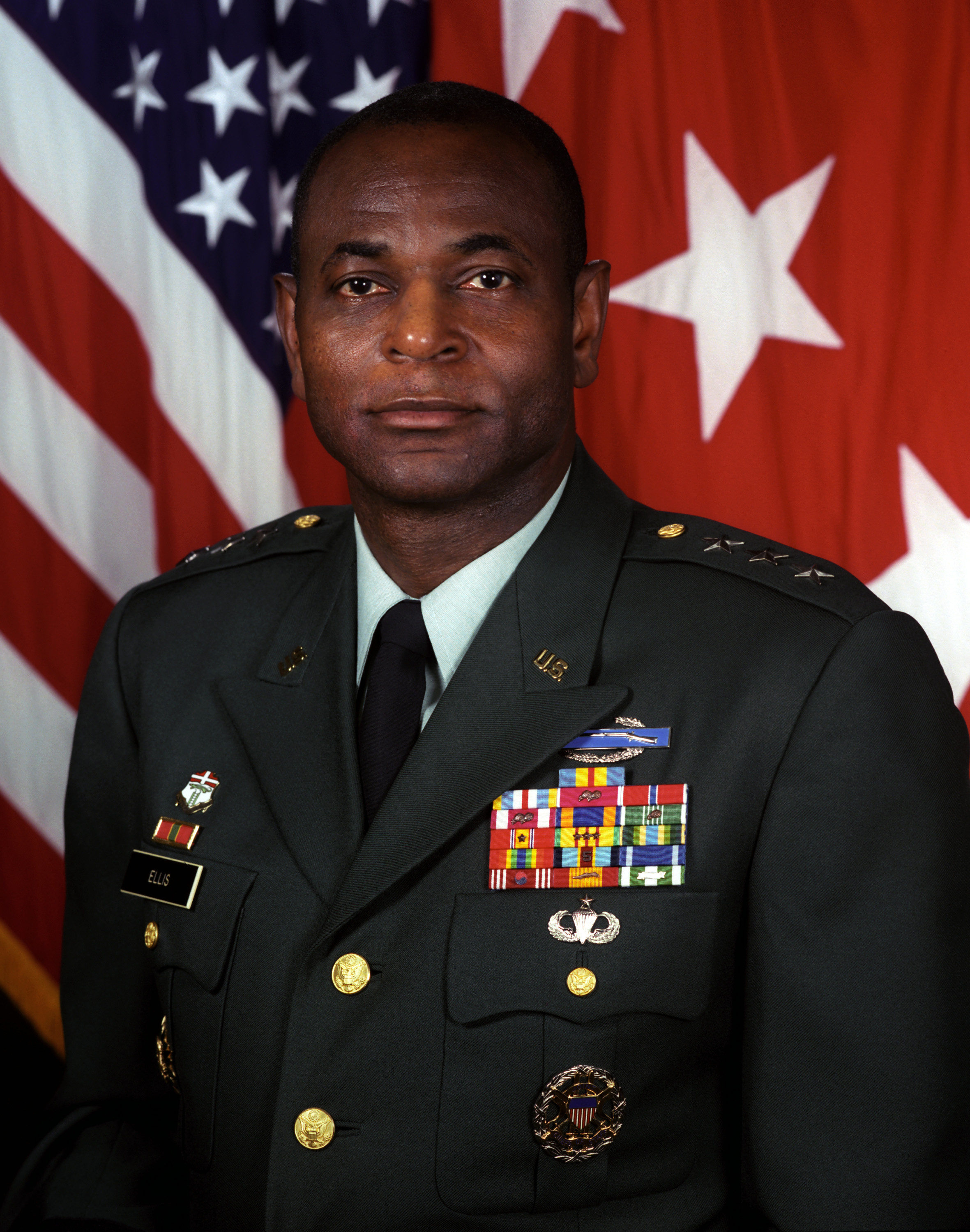
- Born: 30 June 1946 (age 80)
- Military career
- Allegiance: United States
- Branch: United States Army
- Service years: 1969–2004
- Rank: General
- Commands: United States Army Forces Command; 1st Armored Division; Multi-National Division (North)
- Conflicts: Vietnam War
- Awards: Defense Distinguished Service Medal; Army Distinguished Service Medal; Defense Superior Service Medal; Legion of Merit (3); Bronze Star Medal
- Other work: President and CEO, DHB Industries, Inc.

Larry Rudell Ellis (born 30 June 1946) is a former United States Army officer who served as the Commander of United States Army Forces Command from 19 November 2001, until 2004, following his assignment as the Deputy Chief of Staff for Operations and Plans of the Department of the Army.

During his career, Ellis had assignments in the United States, South Vietnam, Germany, South Korea, and Bosnia and Herzegovina. His command assignments include 1st Armored Division, Germany; Multi-National Division (North), Bosnia and Herzegovina; Assistant Division Commander, 2nd Infantry Division, South Korea; Brigade Commander, 3rd Infantry Division, Germany; Battalion Commander, 5th Infantry Division, Fort Polk, Louisiana; Company Commander, 101st Airborne Division, Vietnam; and 82d Airborne Division, Fort Bragg, North Carolina.

== Early life and education ==
Ellis was born in 1946 and earned a Bachelor of Science degree in Physical Education from Morgan State University in 1969. While at Morgan State he was a member of the National Society of Pershing Rifles. He earned a Master of Science degree in Physical education from Indiana University School of Health, Physical Education and Recreation in 1975.

== Military career ==
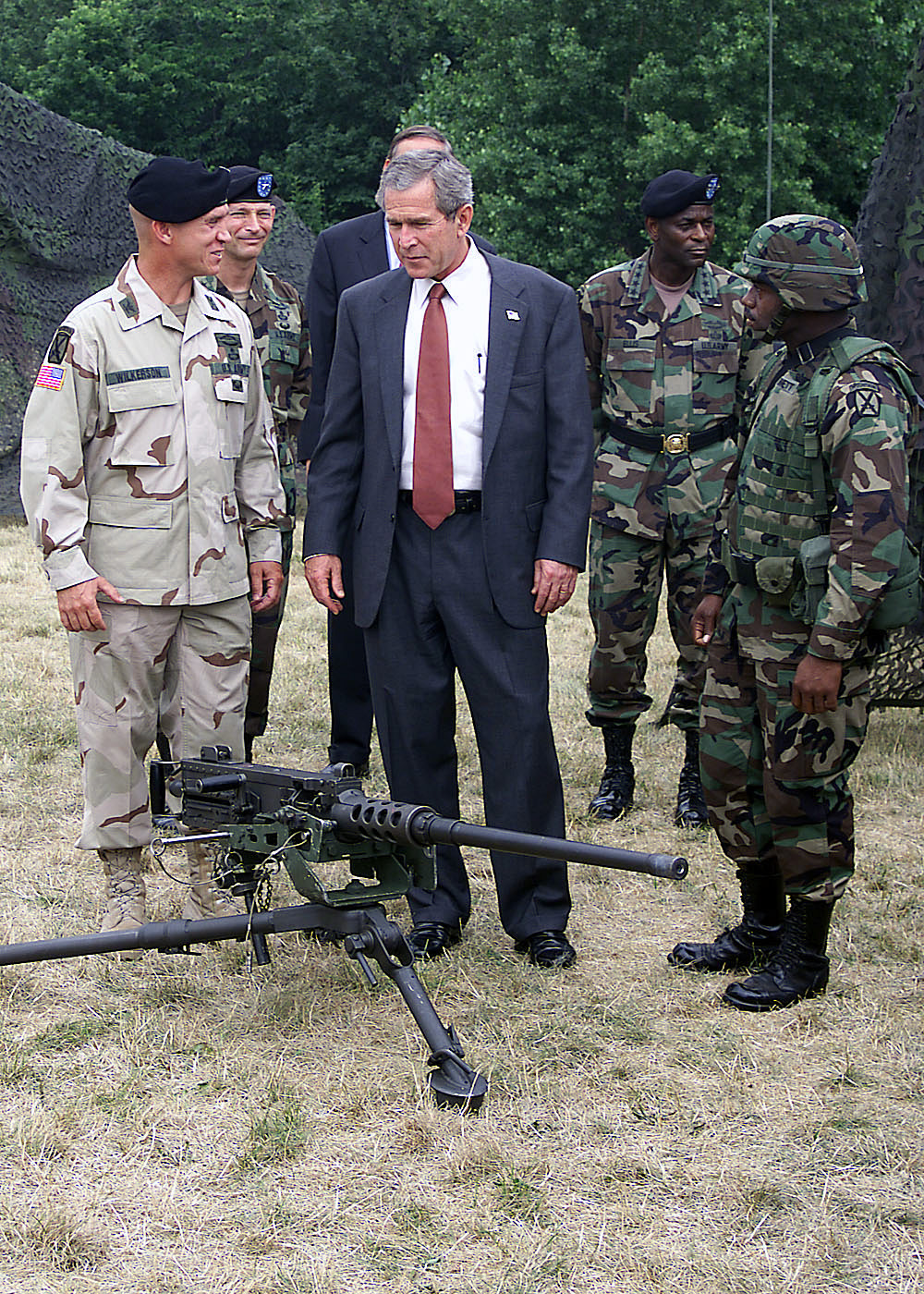
Ellis and U.S. President George W. Bush witness a demonstration of the M2 Browning machine gun in July 2002

Ellis' staff assignments included Deputy Chief of Staff for Operations and Plans; Assistant Deputy Chief of Staff for Personnel, Headquarters, Department of the Army; Assistant Chief of Staff, C3/J3/G3, United Nations Command/Combined Forces Command/United States Forces Korea/Eighth United States Army, South Korea; deputy director for Strategic Planning and Policy, Headquarters, United States Pacific Command, Hawaii; deputy director, Military Personnel Management, Office of the Deputy Chief of Staff for Personnel, Headquarters, Department of the Army; Force Structure Analyst and Chief, Manpower and Force Structure Division, Program Analysis and Evaluation Directorate, Office of Chief of Staff, Headquarters, Department of the Army; Staff Officer, Headquarter, United States Army Europe, Germany; Staff and Faculty, United States Military Academy, West Point; Battalion Staff Officer, 101st Airborne Division, Vietnam; and Battalion Operations Officer, 82d Airborne Division, Fort Bragg, North Carolina.

== Awards and decorations ==
Ellis' awards include the Defense Distinguished Service Medal, the Army Distinguished Service Medal, the Defense Superior Service Medal, the Legion of Merit with two Oak Leaf Clusters, the Bronze Star Medal, the Meritorious Service Medal with two Oak Leaf Clusters, the Air Medal, the Army Commendation Medal with Oak Leaf Cluster, the National Defense Service Medal with three stars, the Armed Forces Expeditionary Medal, the Vietnam Service Medal with three stars, the Armed Forces Service Medal, the Vietnam Cross of Gallantry/Palm, the Korean Cheonsu Medal, the German Armed Forces Honor Cross (Gold), the NATO Medal, the Combat Infantryman Badge, the Senior Parachutist Badge, the Office of Secretary of Defense Staff Identification Badge, the Joint Chiefs of Staff Identification Badge, and the Army General Staff Identification Badge.

== Personal life ==
Following his retirement from the United States Army, Ellis became president and CEO of DHB Industries, a manufacturer of body armor, and has served on the boards of SRA International, the Armed Forces Benefit Association, and Universal Systems and Technology. He is an Associate of Burdeshaw Associates, Ltd., a defense consulting firm. He received the Distinguished Alumni Service Award from Indiana University. He is married to the former Jean Williams of Baltimore, Maryland, and has two adult daughters, one of whom is an army officer.

In the 2024 United States presidential election, Ellis endorsed Kamala Harris.
