= William Karush =

American mathematician and educator

- Karush wearing a Beyond War lapel pin
- Born: March 1, 1917; Chicago, Illinois, U.S.
- Died: February 22, 1997 (aged 79); Los Angeles, California, U.S.
- Education: University of Chicago
- Known for: Contribution to Karush–Kuhn–Tucker conditions
- Scientific career
- Fields: Mathematics
- Workplaces: California State University at Northridge
- Doctoral advisor: Magnus Hestenes

William Karush (1 March 1917 – 22 February 1997) was an American professor of mathematics at California State University at Northridge and was a mathematician best known for his contribution to Karush–Kuhn–Tucker conditions. In his master's thesis he was the first to publish these necessary conditions for the inequality-constrained problem, although he became renowned after a seminal conference paper by Harold W. Kuhn and Albert W. Tucker. He also worked as a physicist for the Manhattan Project, although he signed the Szilárd petition and became a peace activist afterwards.

== Early life and education ==
Sam and Tillie (formerly Shmuel and Tybel) Karush immigrated to the United States from Białystok, then under Russian control, now Poland. Karush was born in Chicago, Illinois on March 1, 1917. He graduated from Murray F. Tuley High School in 1934. He attended the Central YMCA College in Chicago for two years before transferring to University of Chicago, where he studied mathematics and received a Bachelor of Science in 1938, a Masters of Science in 1939, and a Ph.D. in 1942.

== Career ==
From 1942 to 1943, he worked as a mathematician for the Carnegie Institution for Science in Washington, D.C. and from 1943–1945, he was employed by University of Chicago, while working on the Manhattan Project. He stayed at the University of Chicago as an associate professor until 1956 when he took up a position in industry. In 1967 he returned to academia as a professor at California State University, Northridge.

== Selected works ==
- Webster's New World Dictionary of Mathematics, MacMillan Reference Books, Revised edition (April 1989), ISBN 978-0-13-192667-7
- On the Maximum Transform and Semigroups of Transformations (1962), Richard Bellman, William Karush,
- The crescent dictionary of mathematics, general editor (1962) William Karush, Oscar Tarcov
- Isoperimetric problems & index theorems (1942), William Karush, Thesis (Ph.D.) University of Chicago, department of mathematics.
- Minima of functions of several variables with inequalities as side conditions William Karush. (1939), Thesis (M.S.) – University of Chicago, 1939.

== See also ==
- Karush–Kuhn–Tucker conditions
- Szilárd petition
