= David B. Allison =

American geneticist

David Bradley Allison
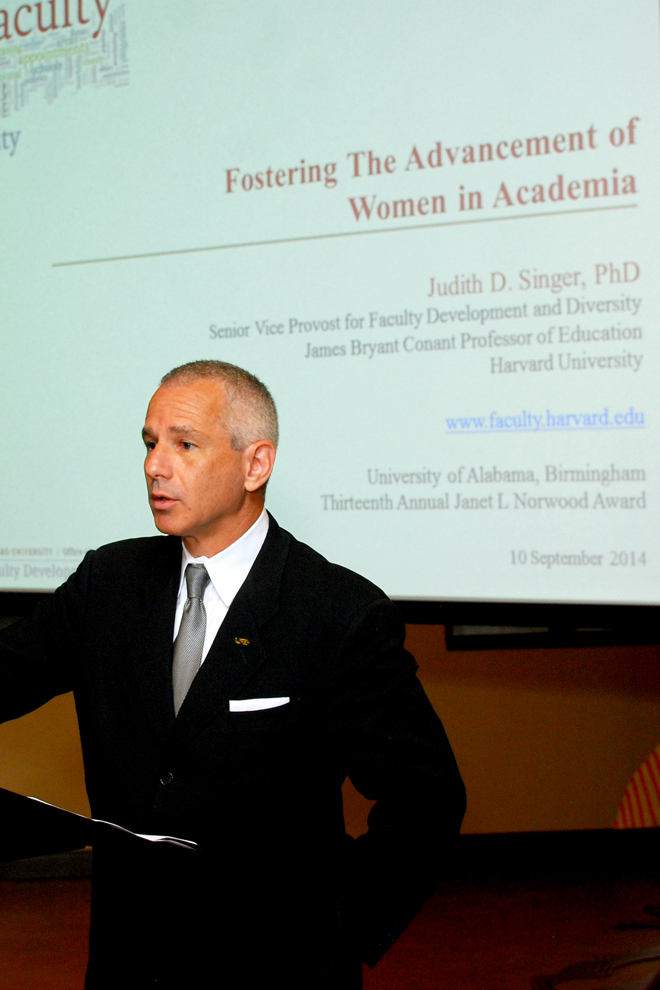
- David B. Allison speaking at an awards presentation
- Born: 1963 (age 62–63); New York City
- Education: Vassar College, Hofstra University
- Awards: Lilly Scientific Achievement Award from the Obesity Society (2002), Presidential Award for Excellence in Science, Mathematics and Engineering Mentoring, Mark Bieber Award from the American College of Nutrition in 2016.
- Scientific career
- Fields: Biostatistics
- Workplaces: Baylor University
- Thesis: Toward an empirically derived typology of obese persons (1990)

David Bradley Allison (born 1963) is an American obesity researcher, biostatistician, and psychologist. He was the dean of the Indiana University School of Public Health-Bloomington and, in 2007, was awarded the ninth most NIH grants. Allison was previously Distinguished Professor, Quetelet Endowed Professor, and Director of the NIH-funded Nutrition Obesity Research Center at the University of Alabama at Birmingham (UAB).

== Career ==
=== Education ===
- 1985 – B.A., Vassar College, Poughkeepsie, New York
- 1987 – M.A., Hofstra University, Hempstead, New York
- 1990 – PhD., Hofstra University, Hempstead, New York
- 1991 – Post-Doc, Johns Hopkins University School of Medicine
- 1994 – Fellowship, Columbia University and St. Luke's-Roosevelt Hospital Center

According to data analyzed by the journal Nature, Allison has ranked in the top 10 for most federally funded grants. Allison is a skeptics regarding commonly issued nutrition advice. Author Judith Stern wrote "He is also known for challenging conventional ideas, exploring novel hypotheses, and holding himself and others to rigorous standards of evidence." Allison has been criticized regarding his stance on questioning the link between consuming any one particular food and obesity, but has been defended by others. Author Terence Kealey referred to Allison as a "heroic guerrilla", noting Allison's willingness to question the evidential biases of cherished beliefs in nutrition, such as the special value of breakfast consumption.

Allison was the founding Field Chief Editor of Frontiers in Genetics, finishing his term in 2017. Allison is a fellow of the National Academy of Medicine, and was recently appointed to the Academy of Europe. He also serves as a consultant and expert witness in the legal setting.

The University of Alabama at Birmingham established the Ronald L. and David. B Allison Endowed Scholar Award and Fund to honor Allison and his father, Ronald, and to provide support for junior faculty who do not yet have R01 funding from the National Institutes of Health. UAB Department of Nutrition Sciences Assistant R. Drew Sayer was named the first Allison scholar in 2021.

On June 23, 2021, the Nathan Shock Centers Coordinating Center held a webinar entitled Best Practices for Using Animals in Aging Research featuring presentations by Arlan Richardson, Catherine Kaczorowski, and Allison and moderated by Steven Austad.

== Selected awards and honors ==
- Named the 2022 Hooker Distinguished Visiting Professor for his leadership and research in the areas of obesity and nutrition, quantitative genetics, clinical trials, statistical and research methodology, and research rigor and integrity
- Recipient of The Obesity Society's 2021 Friends of Albert (Mickey) Stunkard Lifetime Achievement Award in recognition of his lifetime of outstanding contributions to the field of obesity in terms of scholarship, mentorship, and education.
- Appointed to the National Academies of Sciences, Engineering, and Medicine (NASEM) ad hoc committee to address inaccurate and misleading information about biological threats through scientific collaboration and communication in 2021.
- Recipient of the American Statistical Association's San Antonio Chapter 2020 Don Owen Award in recognition of excellence in research, statistical consultation, and service to the statistical community.
- Recipient of the 2020 Pfizer Consumer Healthcare Nutritional Science Award by the American Society for Nutrition (ASN) and its Foundation.
- Testified before the U.S. House of Representatives Committee on Science, Space, and Technology’s hearing “Strengthening Transparency or Silencing Science? The Future of Science in EPA Rulemaking” as a member of NASEM’s Reproducibility and Replicability in Science Committee. Held November 13, 2019.
- Selected to receive The Harry V. Roberts Statistical Advocate of the Year Award from the American Statistical Association, 2018.
- Elected to European Academy of Sciences and Arts, 2018.
- Elected to the Academia Europaea, 2017. Academia Europaea is the only Europe-wide Academy with individual membership from Council of Europe states and other nations across the world and is an organisation of eminent, individual scientists and scholars, covering the full range of academic disciplines.
- Received the Thomas A. Wadden Award for Distinguished Mentorship from the Obesity Society, 2017.
- Recipient of the National Science Foundation–administered 2006 Presidential Award for Excellence in Science, Mathematics, and Engineering Mentoring (PAESMEM).

== Promotion of scientific rigor ==
The New England Journal of Medicine published an article by Allison's group that details myths and presumptions about obesity, and that the scientific community must be open and honest with the public regarding the state of knowledge and should rigorously evaluate unproved strategies. In a 2016 article in the journal Nature, Allison and his colleagues found that mistakes in peer-reviewed papers are easy to find, but hard to fix. Allison has been funded by the National Institutes of Health to teach courses on identifying causal relations in the study of obesity, and exploring traditional and non-traditional techniques that give investigators a broad spectrum of approaches for intervention and preventative treatment of obesity. The National Institutes of Health is funding Allison to explore statistical tools to improve research reproducibility, replicability, and generalizability. Allison was a speaker and lead organizer for the Reproducibility of Research and Issues of Analysis at a COLLOQUIA of the National Academy of Sciences in March 2017. The American Statistical Association awarded Allison the 2018 Harry V. Roberts Statistical Advocate of the Year Award for "Distinguished and longstanding contributions in sound methodology, research integrity, and clear exposition of complex statistical concepts, especially in the globally important fields of nutrition and obesity".

== Skepticism and counter skepticism ==
In 2008, Allison resigned as president-elect of the Obesity Society after signing an affidavit (expert report) stating that there was insufficient scientific evidence available to determine whether a proposed law to require calorie counts to be listed on restaurant menus would be effective in reducing obesity levels. The New York Times reported that Allison's affidavit "ran counter to the conventional thinking in his field" and provoked criticism from some members of the Society. In 2011, ABC News ran a story about Allison. The story quoted him as saying there was too little "solid evidence" to support a link between soft drink consumption and obesity. The article noted that "...critics say his skepticism stems from his financial ties to entities such as Coca-Cola, Pepsi and the American Beverage Association..."

Allison was featured in the 2014 documentary film Fed Up, produced and hosted by Katie Couric, which criticized him for being funded by food companies. Allison responded that "the film-makers' behavior seems counter to thoughtful dialogue," and the film's producers have been accused of deceptive editing. Alan Levinovitz praises Allison in his book “The Gluten Lie”, which discusses the harm that results from what Allison has described as “white-hat bias.” Arthur Firstenberg mentions Allison's study of weight-gain among eight species of animals, and connects it to a conclusion that an unknown global environmental factor is the reason for it.
