= Patricia Silveyra =

American professor

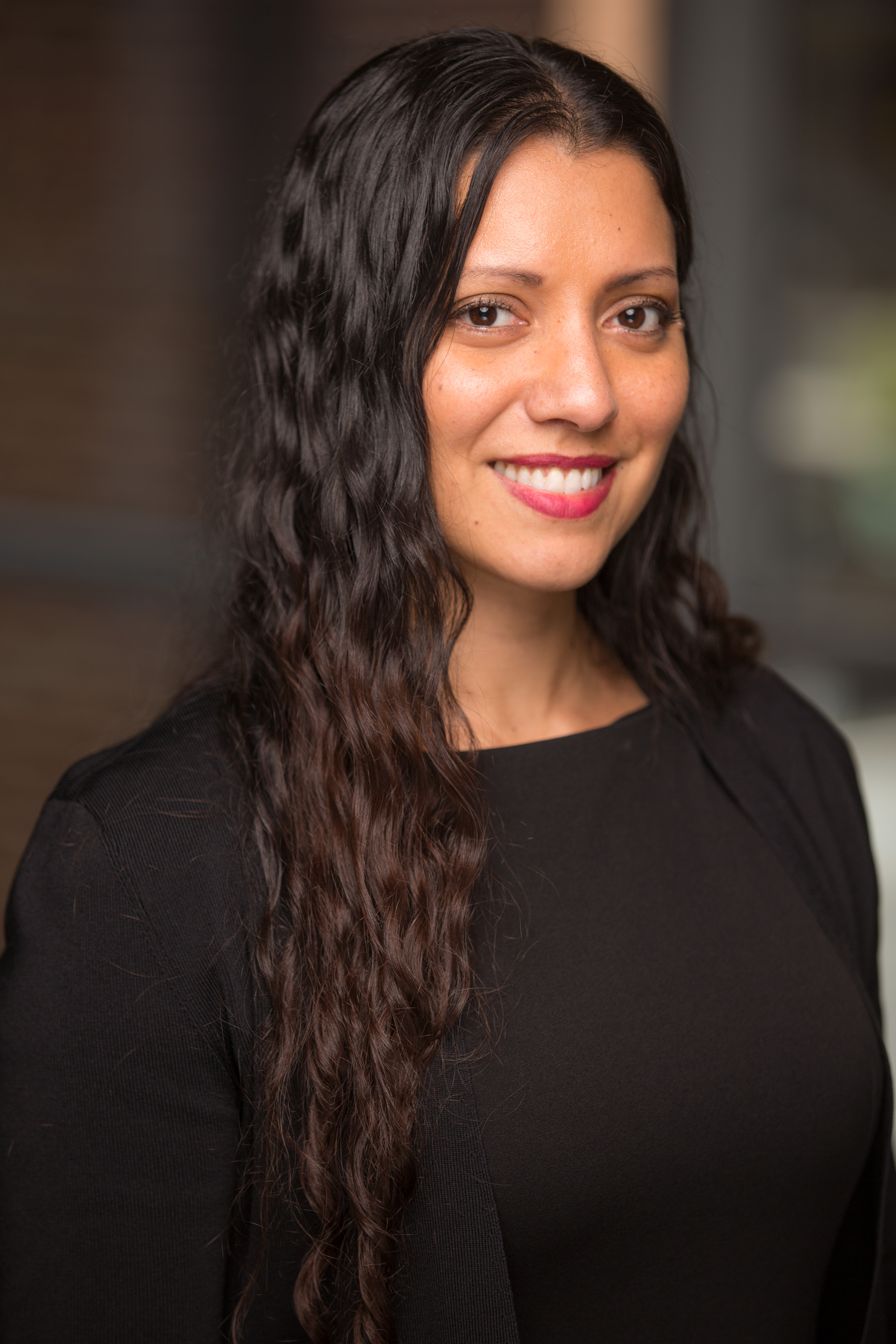
- Born: January 20, 1981 (age 45); Buenos Aires, Argentina
- Education: University of Buenos Aires
- Scientific career
- Fields: Physiology, Molecular Biology, Environmental Health, Sex Differences
- Workplaces: Indiana University Bloomington; University of North Carolina at Chapel Hill; Pennsylvania State University
- Website: Research website Personal website

Patricia Silveyra is an Argentine-American lung physiologist and environmental health researcher. She is a professor, and chair of the Department of Environmental and Occupational Health at the Indiana University School of Public Health-Bloomington. Her research focuses on sex differences in lung inflammation, innate immunity, lung disease, air pollution exposure effects, and e-cigarette exposure, including the effects of sex hormones on related mechanisms.

== Biography ==
Silveyra was born and raised in Buenos Aires, Argentina. She attended the Escuela Superior de Comercio Carlos Pellegrini, one of the University of Buenos Aires's high schools. She later obtained a Licenciatura in Biological Sciences from the Facultad de Ciencias Exactas y Naturales, University of Buenos Aires, when she was only 21 years old. The first in her family to attend graduate school, Silveyra obtained her Doctor of Philosophy degree in Biological Chemistry from the University of Buenos Aires at age 26, after completing her doctoral thesis at the Instituto de Biología y Medicina Experimental and obtaining doctoral scholarships from the National Scientific and Technical Research Council as well as the Agencia Nacional de Promoción Científica y Tecnológica.

In 2008, Silveyra was the only Argentine selected as a Rotary International Ambassadorial Scholar, and moved to Hershey, Pennsylvania to conduct a postdoctoral training at Penn State College of Medicine under Dr. Joanna Floros. In 2013, she established her independent laboratory at Penn State College of Medicine, after receiving funding from Graduate Women in Science and the National Institutes of Health. Between 2015-2016, she served as Interim Director for Diversity and Inclusion in Education at Penn State College of Medicine, where she was promoted to Associate Professor in 2018. From 2018-2020, she worked at the University of North Carolina at Chapel Hill as the Director of the Biobehavioral Laboratory and as a Beerstecher-Blackwell Distinguished term Associate Professor. In 2021, she joined Indiana University Bloomington, as an Associate Professor of Environmental and Occupational Health, and was named a fellow of the American Thoracic Society. In 2022, Silveyra was named the inaugural Anthony D. Pantaleoni Eminent Scholar, an academic honor professors receive at Indiana University Bloomington School of Public Health. The same year, she was named interim chairperson for the Department of Environmental and Occupational Health. She was named chair of the Department, effective July 1, 2023, following a national search. In 2024, Indiana University trustees approved her promotion to professor, making her the first Latina to attain the rank of Full Professor in both the Department and School.

In 2026, Silveyra became President-Elect of SACNAS, beginning a four-year term on the organization's Executive Committee. She had previously been on the SACNAS Board of Directors from 2018 to 2020, including serving as treasurer.

== Research contributions ==
Silveyra's research interests center on the effect of environmental exposures, specifically, inhaled air pollutants, allergens, and vaping/e-cigarettes, on respiratory health and disease. Her laboratory is composed of several trainees (students, postdocs) working together to understand how these exposures differentially affect males and females, an understudied area.

Her group is working to understand the contribution of male and female sex hormones in the development and progression of lung disease. Silveyra has edited and co-authored the first textbook on sex-based differences in lung physiology, in collaboration with the American Physiological Society. Silveyra's work has garnered support from several funding sources, primarily the National Institutes of Health. She has received multiple awards for the quality and impact of her studies and mentoring of junior trainees.

== Advocacy work ==
An advocate for women and underrepresented scholars in science, Silveyra has served on the Board of Directors and as Treasurer of SACNAS, and was a Principal Investigator of a 5-year $8.6 million grant from the NIH that supports The National Diversity in STEM Conference. She has also been recognized with mentoring awards from the American Physiological Society, Penn State College of Medicine, SACNAS, and Indiana University.

In 2018, Silveyra was selected an early career leader and co-chair of the inaugural cohort of the National Academies of Sciences, Engineering, and Medicine New Voices in Sciences, Engineering, and Medicine, an initiative designed to bring diverse perspectives from early-career U.S. leaders to important dialogues around how science, engineering, and medicine are shaping the global future. She was re-appointed as a member of the second cohort in 2021 and as a member of the New Voices advisory board in 2024. Between 2020-2023, she served on the NASEM Board on Higher Education and Workforce. With these organizations, she led international science discussions at the World Laureates Forum and the Science and Technology in Society Forum. She currently serves in several research advisory bodies, such as the Scientific Advisory Committee on Alternative Toxicological Methods and the Inter Academy Partnership. In In 2025, she was invited to serve on the Leadership Board of the American Lung Association in Indiana, with her term beginning on August 1, 2025.

== Awards and honors ==
- Adele Grant Lewis Fellowship, Graduate Women in Science, 2012
- Tribute to Women of Excellence Award, YWCA, 2016.
- “All In” at Penn State: An Achievement Award for Commitment to Diversity and Inclusion, Penn State University, 2017.
- Dale J. Benos Early Career Professional Service Award, American Physiological Society, 2017.
- New Voices in Science, Engineering, and Medicine, National Academy of Sciences, 2018.
- Outstanding Research + Professional Mentor, SACNAS, 2020.
- Fellow of the American Thoracic Society, 2021.
- Anthony D. Pantaleoni Eminent Scholar, 2022.
- Latino Faculty and Staff Council Faculty Award, 2023.
- A. Clifford Barger Underrepresented Minority Mentorship Award, 2023.
