= Walter Bartky =

- Born: September 21, 1901; Chicago, Illinois
- Died: March 19, 1958 (aged 56); Chicago, Illinois
- Education: University of Chicago
- Scientific career
- Fields: Astronomy; Applied mathematics
- Workplaces: University of Chicago; Metallurgical Laboratory
- Thesis: A Method for Computing an Empheris Directly from Three Observations (1926)
- Doctoral students: Adrienne Sophie Rayl

Walter Bartky (1901–1958) was an American astronomer, applied mathematician, and educator, who participated in the Manhattan Project.

== Education and career ==
Walter Bartky received his B.S. from the University of Chicago in 1923 and his Ph.D. in 1926. At the University of Chicago he was an instructor in 1926, an assistant professor of astronomy from 1927 to 1932, and an associate professor of astronomy from 1932 to 1942. At the University of Chicago he became in 1943 a professor of applied mathematics and associate dean in the Division of Physical Sciences, served from 1945 to 1955 as the dean of the Division of Physical Sciences, and served from 1955 to 1958 as vice president in charge special scientific programs.

Walter Bartky was from 1926 to 1930 a consulting mathematician to Western Electric Company. In 1935 his book Highlights of Astronomy was published. During World War II he was the assistant director of the Manhattan Project's Metallurgical Laboratory at the University of Chicago.

In 1945 he was one of the signers of the Szilárd petition. In May 1945, he accompanied Leo Szilard and Harold Urey to Spartanburg, South Carolina to present a memorandum to James F. Byrnes; the memorandum suggested that dropping an atomic bomb on Japan might start a nuclear arms race with the Soviet Union.

== Personal life ==
On 9 January 1932, Walter Bartky married Elizabeth Inrig Robertson, of Glasgow, Scotland. The marriage produced two children, Walter Scott Bartky and Ian Robertson Bartky. W. Scott Bartky (1932–2010) was an engineer, entrepreneur and inventor with over 40 patents. Ian R. Bartky (1934–2007) was a physical chemist and historian of science.

== Selected publications ==
- with A. J. Dempster: Bartky, W.; Dempster, A. J. (1929). "Paths of charged particles in electric and magnetic fields". Physical Review. 33 (6): 1019. Bibcode:1929PhRv...33.1019B. doi:10.1103/PhysRev.33.1019.
- with W. D. MacMillan: MacMillan, W. D.; Bartky, Walter (1932). "Permanent configurations in the problem of four bodies". Trans. Amer. Math. Soc. 34 (4): 838–875. doi:10.1090/S0002-9947-1932-1501666-7.
- Bartky, Walter (1938). "Numerical calculation of a generalized complete elliptic integral". Reviews of Modern Physics. 10 (4): 264. Bibcode:1938RvMP...10..264B. doi:10.1103/RevModPhys.10.264.
- Bartky, Walter (1943). "Multiple sampling with constant probability". The Annals of Mathematical Statistics. 14 (4): 363–377. doi:10.1214/aoms/1177731357. JSTOR 2235924.
- with A. J. Dempster: Bartky, W.; Dempster, A. J. (1948). "The Approach to Equilibrium in Fractionation". Reviews of Modern Physics. 20 (1): 123. Bibcode:1948RvMP...20..123B. doi:10.1103/RevModPhys.20.123.

== Patents ==
- "Star Finder, US Patent 2,032,829". 3 March 1936.
- "Ball, US Patent 1,890,566". 13 December 1932.
