= Adrienne Sophie Rayl =

American mathematician (1898–1989)

- Born: September 25, 1898; New Orleans, Louisiana, US
- Died: November 27, 1989 (aged 91); New Orleans, Louisiana, US
- Burial place: Greenwood Cemetery, New Orleans
- Education: Tulane University; University of Chicago
- Occupations: Mathematician, professor
- Known for: PhD in math before World War II

Adrienne Sophie Rayl (1898–1989) was an American mathematician and one of the few women to earn a PhD in mathematics in the United States before World War II.

== Biography ==
Rayl was born September 25, 1898, in New Orleans, Louisiana, to Sophie Catherine Schick and James John Rayl and was the oldest of their eight children. She attended public grade school and Girls High School in New Orleans, where she graduated in 1915, first in her class. From there she enrolled at New Orleans Normal School finishing with a teaching diploma, and again she graduated first in her class, in 1917.

=== Teacher ===
Rayl immediately began teaching in the seventh and eighth grades at the Beauregard School and, at the same time, she began working toward her bachelor's degree at Tulane University. She was presented with her BA in education in 1924. In 1939, she became the mathematics instructor at Edward Douglas White High School and stayed there until 1939. While teaching at the high school, she attended summer school and afternoon classes, at Tulane, including classes by mathematicians Nola Anderson Haynes and Marie Weiss. Rayl earned her MA in 1934 and immediately moved to Chicago to pursue doctoral studies at the University of Chicago. The work required to complete her undergraduate and graduate degrees while teaching in the New Orleans public school system had taken her 22 years.

Beginning in 1934 in Chicago, Rayl studied for five consecutive summers and full-time during the academic year 1936–1937, to complete her dissertation under Walter Bartky in August 1939. Rayl's dissertation concerned the four-body problem and was titled, Stability of Permanent Configurations in the Problem of Four Bodies. She had begun work in this area while at Tulane and had solved a physics problem related to the three-body problem when she was taking a celestial mechanics course there from Herbert Earle Buchanan.

=== Professor ===
With her doctorate, Rayl taught for the next 30 years at the University of Alabama Extension Center (now the University of Alabama at Birmingham). When she first became an instructor in 1939, there were not any women enrolled as students at the school. When she retired, a local news article quoted her saying, "The Center had been open only three years when I first came . . . and although there were only 116 students enrolled, it was a wonderful opportunity for the working man to attend our evening classes."

In Birmingham, she went on to hold positions of increasing responsibility: instructor 1939–1941, assistant professor 1941–1947, associate professor 1947–1952, and full professor 1952–1969. When she retired in 1969, Rayl was awarded the rank of professor emeritus. While there she taught calculus, differential equations, vector analysis, complex variables, and advanced calculus among other courses. She also served as chairman of the school's Division of Mathematics.

In the early 1980s she moved back to New Orleans. She died there on November 27, 1989, at 91 and was buried in the Greenwood Cemetery in New Orleans.

== Selected works ==
- Rayl, Adrienne Sophie. Stability of Permanent Configurations in the Problem of Four Bodies...: By Adrienne Sophie Rayl... University of Chicago, 1942. https://openlibrary.org/books/OL183522M/Stability_of_permanent_configurations_in_the_problem_of_four_bodies
