= Szilárd petition =

1945 American petition on atomic weapon use

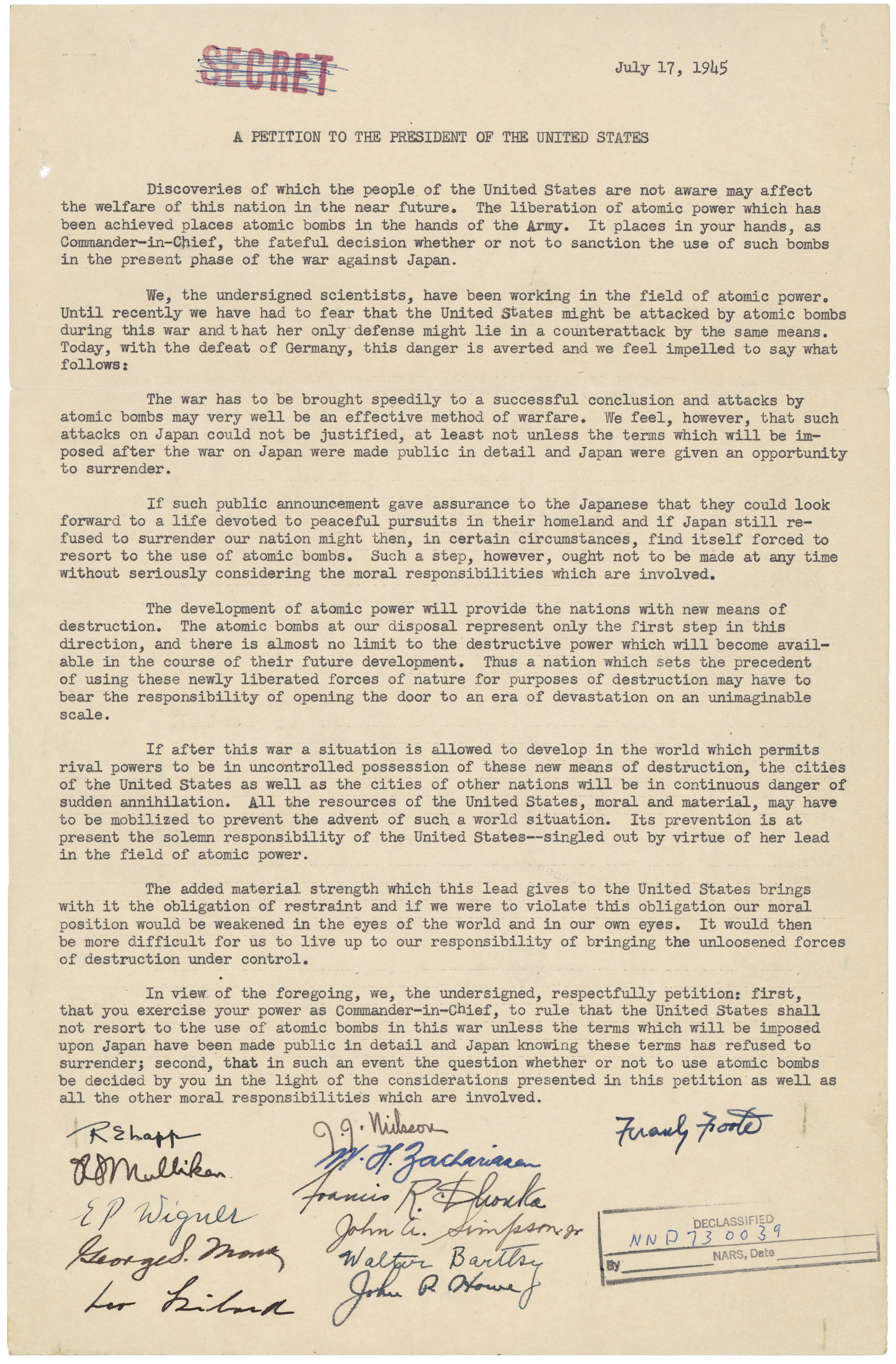
Petition in the "final" version of July 17th 1945

The Szilárd petition, drafted and circulated in July 1945 by scientist Leo Szilard, was signed by 70 scientists working on the Manhattan Project in Oak Ridge, Tennessee, and the Metallurgical Laboratory in Chicago, Illinois. It asked President Harry S. Truman to inform Japan of the terms of surrender demanded by the allies, and allow Japan to either accept or refuse these terms, before America used atomic weapons. However, the petition never made it through the chain of command to President Truman. It was not declassified and made public until 1961.

Later, in 1946, Szilárd jointly with Albert Einstein, created the Emergency Committee of Atomic Scientists that counted among its board, Linus Pauling (Nobel Peace Prize in 1962).

== Background ==
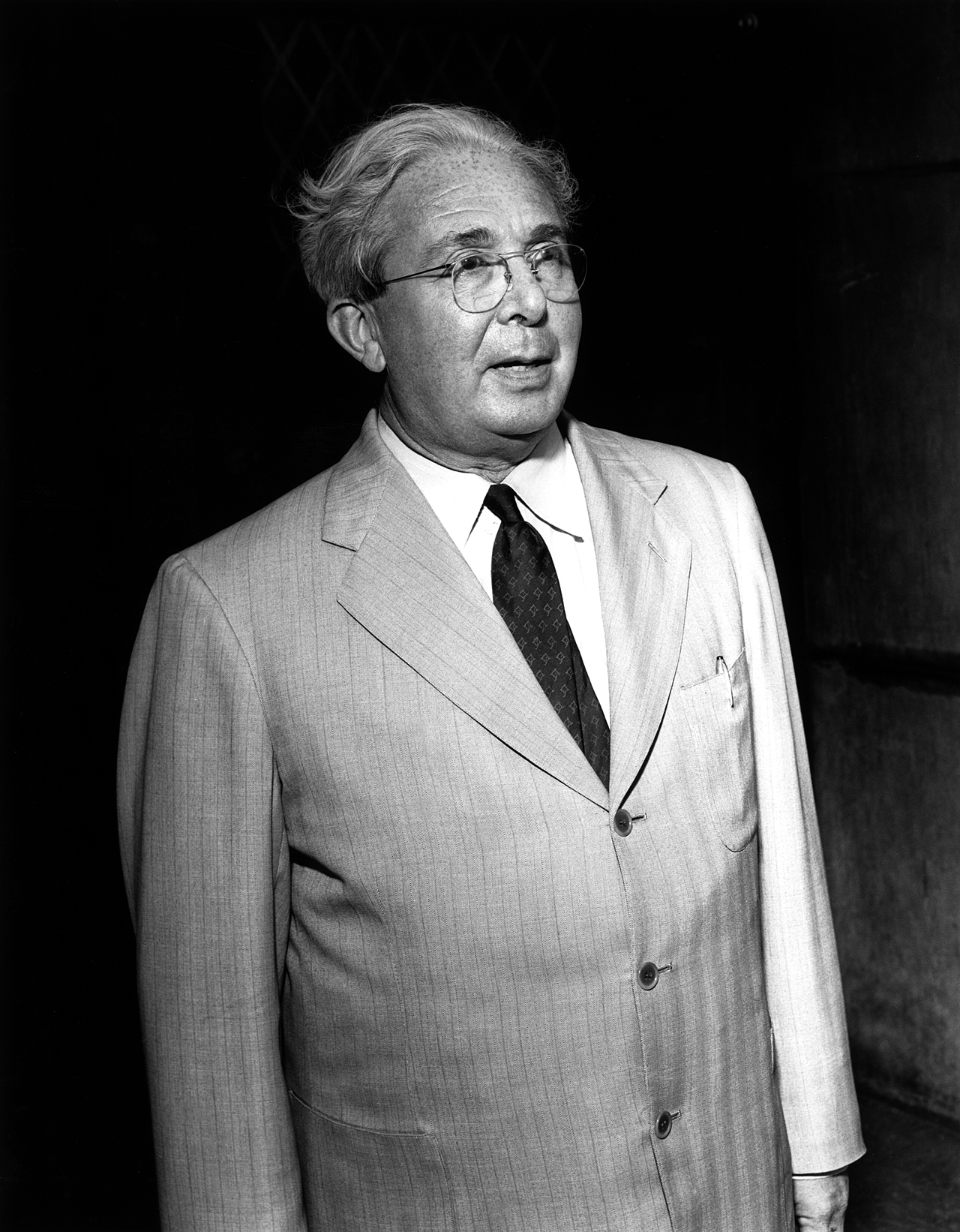
Leó Szilárd

The petition was preceded by the Franck Report, written by the Committee on the Social and Political Implications of the Atomic Bomb, of which James Franck was the chair. Szilárd and Met Lab colleague Glenn T. Seaborg co-wrote the report, which argued that political security in a post-nuclear world would rely upon international exchange and ownership of atomic information, and that in order to avoid a nuclear arms race and preserve goodwill towards the United States, Japan must be given proper warning ahead of the dropping of the bomb.

Unlike the Franck Report, which by and large focused on the politics of using the atomic bomb and the possibility of international collaboration, the Szilárd Petition was a moral plea. Its signatories, foreseeing an age of rapid nuclear expansion, warned that, should the United States drop the bomb to end the war in the Pacific theater, they would "bear the responsibility of opening the door to an era of devastation on an unimaginable scale." They feared that, in using the bomb, the United States would lose moral authority to bring the subsequent nuclear arms race under control.

More than 50 of the initial signatories worked in the Chicago branch of the Manhattan Project. After much disagreement among the other scientists in Chicago, lab director Farrington Daniels took a survey of 150 scientists as to what they believed the best course of action would be, regarding the bomb. The results were as follows:

- 15% - the bomb should be used as a weapon by the military in order to bring about Japanese surrender with the fewest possible Allied casualties.
- 46% - the bomb should be demonstrated by the military in Japan, with the hope that surrender would follow; if not, the bomb should be used as a weapon.
- 26% - the bomb should be part of an experimental demonstration in the United States, with a Japanese delegation present as witnesses in the hope that they would bring their observations back to the government and advocate for surrender.
- 11% - the bomb should be used only as part of a public demonstration.
- 2% - the bomb should not be used in combat and total secrecy should be maintained afterwards.

Szilárd asked his friend and fellow physicist, Edward Teller, to help circulate the petition at Los Alamos in the hopes of recruiting more signatures. However, Teller first brought Szilárd's request to Los Alamos director J. Robert Oppenheimer, who told Teller that politicians in Washington were already weighing the issue and that the lab scientists would do better to stay out of it. Thus, no new signatures for the petition were collected at Los Alamos.

== Summary ==
The petition was addressed to President Truman and stated that the original intention of the Manhattan Project was to defend the United States against a possible nuclear attack by Germany, a threat that had by then been eradicated. They then pleaded with Truman to make public the full terms of surrender and to await a Japanese response before dropping the atom bomb, and to consider his "obligation of restraint":

"If after this war a situation is allowed to develop in the world which permits rival powers to be in uncontrolled possession of these new means of destruction, the cities of the United States as well as the cities of other nations will be in continuous danger of sudden annihilation [...] The added material strength which this lead gives to the United States brings with it the obligation of restraint and if we were to violate this obligation our moral position would be weakened in the eyes of the world and in our own eyes. It would then be more difficult for us to live up to our responsibility of bringing the unloosened forces of destruction under control. We, the undersigned, respectfully petition: first, that you exercise your power as Commander-in-Chief, to rule that the United States shall not resort to the use of atomic bombs in this war unless the terms which will be imposed upon Japan have been made public in detail and Japan knowing these terms has refused to surrender; second, that in such an event the question whether or not to use atomic bombs be decided by you in the light of the considerations presented in this petition as well as all the other moral responsibilities which are involved."

== Aftermath ==
In the spring of 1945, Szilárd took the petition to the man who was soon to be named Secretary of State, James F. Byrnes, hoping to find someone who would pass on to President Truman the message from scientists that the bomb should not be used on a civilian population in Japan, and that after the war it should be put under international control in order to avoid a post-war arms race. Byrnes was not sympathetic to the idea at all. Thus, President Truman never saw the petition prior to the dropping of the bomb. Szilárd regretted that such a man was so influential in politics, and he appeared to also be despondent at having become a physicist, because in his career he had contributed to the creation of the bomb. After the meeting with Byrnes, he is quoted as having said, "How much better off the world might be had I been born in America and become influential in American politics, and had Byrnes been born in Hungary and studied physics."

In response to the petition, General Leslie Groves, the director of the Manhattan Project, tried to find evidence against Szilárd to charge him with violating the Espionage Act. This involved writing to Frederick Lindemann, the UK's prime scientific adviser during WW1. However, this failed to dig up evidence as Lindemann reported that actually Szilárd's "security was good to the point of brusqueness".

The first atomic bomb, known as Little Boy, was dropped on Hiroshima on August 6, 1945. It was followed three days later by a second bomb, known as Fat Man, over Nagasaki. The deployment of these bombs led to an estimated 200,000 civilians dead and, debatably, Japan's eventual surrender. In December 1945, a study by Fortune business magazine found that over three-quarters of Americans surveyed approved of the decision to drop the bombs. In spite of this, a group of the most prominent scientists of the day united to speak out against the decision, and about the future nuclear arms race. One World or None: A Report to the Public on the Full Meaning of the Atomic Bomb was released in 1946, containing essays by Leo Szilárd himself, Albert Einstein, Niels Bohr, Arthur Compton, Robert Oppenheimer, Harold Urey, Eugene Wigner, Edward Condon, Hans Bethe, Irving Langmuir, and others. The theme of the book, which sold over a million copies, was that nuclear arms should never be used again and that international cooperation should govern their use.

== Signatories ==
The 70 signers at the Manhattan Project's Metallurgical Laboratory in Chicago, in alphabetical order, with their positions, were:

1. David S. Anthony, Associate Chemist
2. Larned B. Asprey, Junior Chemist, S.E.D.
3. Walter Bartky, Assistant Director
4. Austin M. Brues, Director, Biology Division
5. Mary Burke, Research Assistant
6. Albert Cahn, Jr., Junior Physicist
7. George R. Carlson, Research Assistant-Physics
8. Kenneth Stewart Cole, Principal Bio-Physicist
9. Ethaline Hartge Cortelyou, Junior Chemist
10. John Crawford, Physicist
11. Mary M. Dailey, Research Assistant
12. Miriam Posner Finkel, Associate Biologist
13. Frank G. Foote, Metallurgist
14. Horace Owen France, Associate Biologist
15. Mark S. Fred, Research Associate-Chemistry
16. Sherman Fried, Chemist
17. Francis Lee Friedman, Physicist
18. Melvin S. Friedman, Associate Chemist
19. Mildred C. Ginsberg, Computer
20. Norman Goldstein, Junior Physicist
21. Sheffield Gordon, Associate Chemist
22. Walter J. Grundhauser, Research Assistant
23. Charles W. Hagen, Research Assistant
24. David B. Hall, Physicist
25. David L. Hill, Associate Physicist, Argonne
26. John Perry Howe, Jr., Associate Division Director, Chemistry
27. Earl K. Hyde, Associate Chemist
28. Jasper B. Jeffries, Junior Physicist, Junior Chemist
29. William Karush, Associate Physicist
30. Truman P. Kohman, Chemist-Research
31. Herbert E. Kubitschek, Junior Physicist
32. Alexander Langsdorf, Jr., Research Associate
33. Ralph E. Lapp, Assistant To Division Director
34. Lawrence B. Magnusson, Junior Chemist
35. Robert Joseph Maurer, Physicist
36. Norman Frederick Modine, Research Assistant
37. George S. Monk, Physicist
38. Robert James Moon, Physicist
39. Marietta Catherine Moore, Technician
40. Robert Sanderson Mulliken, Coordinator of Information
41. J. J. Nickson, [Medical Doctor, Biology Division]
42. William Penrod Norris, Associate Biochemist
43. Paul Radell O'Connor, Junior Chemist
44. Leo Arthur Ohlinger, Senior Engineer
45. Alfred Pfanstiehl, Junior Physicist
46. Robert Leroy Platzman, Chemist
47. C. Ladd Prosser, Biologist
48. Robert Lamburn Purbrick, Junior Physicist
49. Wilfrid Rall, Research Assistant-Physics
50. Margaret H. Rand, Research Assistant, Health Section
51. William Rubinson, Chemist
52. B. Roswell Russell, position not identified
53. George Alan Sacher, Associate Biologist
54. Francis R. Shonka, Physicist
55. Eric L. Simmons, Associate Biologist, Health Group
56. John A. Simpson, Jr., Physicist
57. Ellis P. Steinberg, Junior Chemist
58. D. C. Stewart, S/Sgt S.E.D.
59. George Svihla, position not identified [Health Group]
60. Marguerite N. Swift, Associate Physiologist, Health Group
61. Leo Szilard, Chief Physicist
62. Ralph E. Telford, position not identified
63. Joseph D. Teresi, Associate Chemist
64. Albert Wattenberg, Physicist
65. Katharine Way, Research Assistant
66. Edgar Francis Westrum, Jr., Chemist
67. Eugene Paul Wigner, Physicist
68. Ernest J. Wilkins, Jr., Associate Physicist
69. Hoylande Young, Senior Chemist
70. William Houlder Zachariasen, Consultant

== See also ==
- Einstein–Szilard letter
- Nuclear ethics
- Nuclear weapons debate
