= Hoylande Young =

American chemist

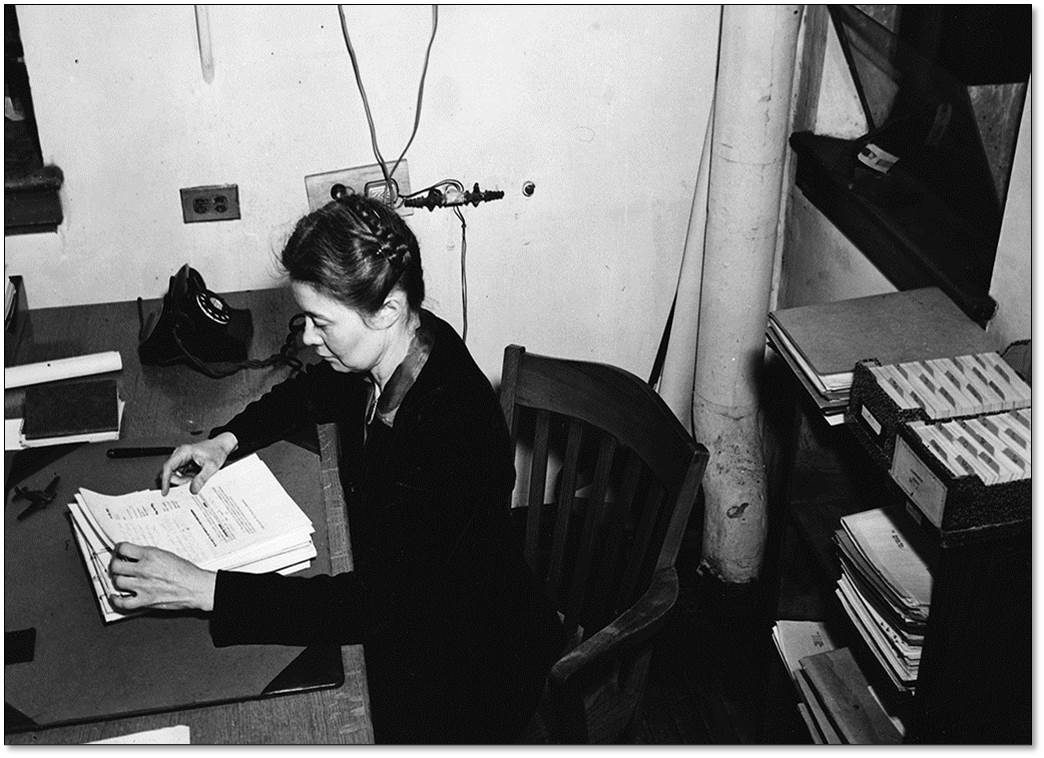
- Dr. Hoylande Young, director of Argonne’s Technical Information Division. Her office measured 9 x 6 feet.
- Born: Hoylande Denune Young; June 26, 1903; Columbus, Ohio, United States
- Died: January 12, 1986 (aged 82); Hyde Park, Chicago, United States
- Education: Ohio State University; University of Chicago
- Scientific career
- Fields: Chemistry
- Workplaces: Texas State College for Women; University of Chicago; Metallurgical Laboratory; Argonne National Laboratory
- Thesis: Stereoisomeric Bromoimino Ketones (1926)
- Doctoral advisor: Julius Stieglitz

Hoylande Denune Young Failey (June 26, 1903 – January 12, 1986) was an American chemist. During World War II she worked at the Manhattan Project's Metallurgical Laboratory. After the war she became the first woman to be appointed as a division head at the Argonne National Laboratory, and the first woman to chair the Chicago Section of the American Chemical Society.

== Early life and education ==
Hoylande Denune Young was born in Columbus, Ohio, on June 26, 1903. She had a sister, Hilda. She became interested in chemistry when she was in high school, where there were separate boys' and girls' chemistry classes. Due to course scheduling conflicts she was permitted to take the more challenging boys' course, although she had to sit up the back of the class. She entered Ohio State University, from which she received a Bachelor of Science degree in chemistry in 1924. She then went on to earn a Doctor of Philosophy at the University of Chicago, writing her thesis on "Stereoisomeric Bromoimino Ketones" under the supervision of Julius Stieglitz.

== Career ==
After graduating, Young became an industrial research chemist, working in the lacquer industry at Van Schaack Brothers Chemical Works in Chicago. In 1930, she became an assistant professor of chemistry at Texas State College for Women, where she taught nutrition and biochemistry. In 1934, she resigned to take up an offer from Michael Reese Hospital in Chicago, but when she arrived the director found out that she was a woman, and refused to hire her. Jobs were hard to find during the Great Depression, and she was a consultant with no regular employment until 1938, when she took a position with Pure Oil. There she worked with Cary R. Wagner, Jr., on a book on petroleum refining. The project went on for six years, but it was interrupted by the outbreak of World War II, and the book was never published.

With the United States at war, Young took a job in 1942 as a scientific librarian with the Office of Scientific Research and Development (OSRD) at the University of Chicago's Toxicity Laboratory, compiling American, British and Canadian reports on chemical warfare, and preparing an index of toxic chemicals. In 1945, she transferred to the Manhattan Project's Metallurgical Laboratory as a chemist. There she edited papers that would later be published by the Atomic Energy Commission as part of its National Nuclear Energy Series. She later served on the editorial board of the National Nuclear Energy Series, representing the Argonne National Laboratory.

She signed the Szilárd petition of 1945.

In 1946, Young joined the newly created Argonne National Laboratory in 1946 as Director of Technical Information, the first woman to be appointed a division head. She would remain at Argonne until she retired in 1964.

== Memberships and recognition ==
In 1956, she became the first woman to be appointed chair of the Chicago Section of the American Chemical Society. She was involved in setting up its Distinguished Service Award, and later received it herself in 1975. She was also a fellow of the American Institute of Chemists, the American Association for the Advancement of Science and the Atomic Scientists of Chicago. She was a charter member of the American Nuclear Society and the president of Iota Sigma Pi, a national honor society for women in chemistry. In 1959, the Chicago Tribune named her as one of the city's most distinguished women in business or the professions, and the Argonne National Laboratory established the Hoylande D. Young lecture series in her honor in 1963.

== Personal life ==
Young married Crawford Failey, whom she had known in the Toxicity Laboratory. She died at her home in Hyde Park, Chicago, on January 12, 1986, and was buried in the Riverside Cemetery, Columbus, Ohio.
