= Miriam Posner Finkel =

American radiobiologist

Miriam Dorothy (Posner) Finkel (22 January 1916 – 20 August 1999) was a radiobiologist who made significant contributions to molecular biology. Finkel lent her name to the Finkel-Biskis-Jinkins or FBJ virus.

== Biography ==
Miriam Dorothy (Miriam Dvorah) Posner was born into a Jewish family on 22 January 1916 in Chicago, Illinois. Her parents, Jacob Israel Posner and Esther Greenfield were born in Kyiv, Ukraine and Grodno, Belarus, respectively. She grew up in Davenport, Iowa and married Asher Joseph Finkel in 1943.

Finkel attended the University of Chicago and earned a B.S. in zoology in 1938. She worked as a laboratory instructor at Wilson Junior College in Chicago while she pursued doctoral studies and coursework in zoology. In 1944, she was awarded a Ph.D. from the University of Chicago.

She signed the Szilárd petition of 1945.

Finkel worked at the Metallurgical Laboratory and the Clinton Engineer Works as a radiobiologist. For the majority of her careerp, she worked at Argonne National Laboratory. She was a member of the American Biological Society.

Finkel made significant contributions to several radiological health standards including work on the basis of relative biological effectiveness for internal exposure to radioisotopes. Through her work and that of her colleagues, she was able to isolate the murine osteogenic sarcoma virus, now known as the Finkel-Biskis-Jenkins or FBJ virus. This and other pursuits resulted in discoveries in viral-induced tumors and resulted in the molecular biological tool, the FOS gene.

Finkel died on 20 August 1999 at home in Tucson, Arizona.

== Works ==
=== Dissertation ===
- The relation of sex hormones to pigmentation and to testis descent in the opossum and ground squirrel, 1945.

=== Patents ===
- Experimental animal maintenance, 1963.
- Experimental animal watering device, 1964.

=== 1940s ===
- Lisco, Hermann, Finkel, M. P., & Brues, Austin Moore. (1947). Carcinogenic Properties of Radioactive Fission Products and of Plutonium 1. Radiology. 49(3): 361–363.
- Finkel, M. P. (1947). The transmission of radio-strontium and plutonium from mother to offspring in laboratory animals. Physiological zoology. 20(4): 405–421.
- Finkel, M. P., Kisieleski, Walter E., Hirsch, Gertrude M., & Mulhaney, Thomas J. (1949). POLONIUM AND CF-1 FEMALE MICE: THE 30-DAY LD50 RETENTION, DISTRIBUTION, AND CONCENTRATION. BIOLOGICAL AND MEDICAL DIVISIONS QUARTERLY REPORT MAY, JUNE, JULY, 1949, 84.
- Schubert, Jack, Finkel, M. P., White, Marcia R., & Hirsch, Gertrude M. (1949). Plutonium and Yttrium content of the blood, liver, and skeleton of the rat at different times after intravenous administration. BIOLOGICAL AND MEDICAL DIVISIONS QUARTERLY REPORT MAY, JUNE, JULY, 1949, 135.

=== 1950–1954 ===
- Brues, Austin M., Hasterlik, R. J., Finkel, M. P., Norris, W. P., Kisieleski, W. E., & Schubert, J. (1950). Special Problems Dr. Donald L. Buchanan. Allen, JG: Tests of Liver Function. Kansas City Academy, Kansas City. 57.
- Finkel, M. P., & Hirsch, G. M. (1950). URANIUM TOXICITY IN MICE I. EXPERIMENTAL DESIGN AND RESULTS AT 30 DAYS (No. AECD-3045; ANL-4531). Argonne National Lab.
- Finkel, M. P. (1951). Toxicology of uranium. Journal of Chemical Education. (28): 400.
- Finkel, M. P. (1952). Biological Effects of External Beta Radiation (Zirkle, Raymond E.). Journal of Chemical Education. (29): 476.
- Finkel, M. P. (1953). Relative biological effectiveness of radium and other alpha emitters in CF No. 1 female mice. Experimental Biology and Medicine. 83(3): 494–498.
- Finkel, M. P., Brues, Austin M., & Lisco, Hermann. (1954). THE TOXICITY OF Sr89 IN MICE. ANL-4840 (Quarterly Report, May, June, July, 1952). 25.

=== 1955–1957 ===
- Finkel, M. P. (1955). Internal emitters and tumor induction. In International Conference on the Peaceful Uses of Atomic Energy, A/CONF. (8): 160–164.
- Finkel, M. P., & Scribner, Gertrude M. (1955). Mouse cages and spontaneous tumors. British journal of cancer. 9(3): 464.
- Finkel, M. P. (1956). Relative Biological Effectiveness of Internal Emitters 1.Radiology. 67(5): 665–672.
- Finkel, M. P., Lisco, Hermann, Lathrop, Katherine A., & Brues, Austin M. (1956). TOXICITY OF LOCALLY DEPOSITED YTTRIUM91 IN MICE. I. EXPERIMENTAL DESIGN AND GROSS PATHOLOGY. BIOLOGICAL AND MEDICAL RESEARCH DIVISION QUARTERLY REPORT. 39.
- Finkel, M. P., & Scribner, G. M. (1956). TOXICITY OF Sr90 and of Ca45in Mice. BIOLOGICAL AND MEDICAL RESEARCH DIVISION QUARTERLY REPORT. 16.
- Finkel, M. P., Biskis, Birute O., & Scribner, G. M. (1957). Toxicity of Sr90 AND OF Ca4* IN MICE. Biological and Medical Research Semiannual Report. 51.
- Finkel, M. P., Flynn, R., Clark, J., Scribner, G., Lestina, Juanita, Lisco, H., & Brues, A. (1957). Toxicity of radiostrontium in carnivores: Current status of the long-term cat and dog experiments. Quarterly Report of Biological and Medical Research Division, Argonne National Laboratory. ANL-5696: 16–20.
- Finkel, M. P., Tellekson, Betty J., Lestina, Juanita, & Biskis, Birute O. (1957). The influence of dosage pattern upon the toxicity of Sr90 in mice. I. Preliminary experiment. (21): 21–31.
- Finkel, M. P., Flynn, Robert J., Lestina, Juanita, & Czajka, Dorice M. (1957). Radiostrontium at" Optimum Carcinogenic Level" in the Dog: Effect upon Morbidity of Total Blood Exchange Shortly After Injection. Biological and Medical Research Division Semiannual Report. 15.

=== 1958–1959 ===
- Finkel, M. P. (1958). Mice, Men, and Fallout: The potential danger of strontium-90 is appraised on the basis of data from animal experiments. Science. 128(3325): 637–641.
- Finkel, M. P., Biskis, B. O., & Scribner, G. M. (1958). The influence of strontium-90 upon life span and neoplasms of mice (No. A/CONF. 15/P/911). Argonne National Lab., Lemont, Illinois.
- Finkel, M. P., & Biskis, B. O. (1958). Comparative carcinogenicity of Ra 226, Sr 90 and Ca 45 in mice. USAEC Unclassified Report ANL-5916: 18.
- FINKEL, M. P. (1958). Radiation Hazards. Science. 128(3338): 1580–1585.
- Finkel, M. P. (1958). TOXICITY OF Sr90 AND OF Ca45 in Mice. III. Effect of Sr90 Upon Life Span and Neoplasms of Bone and the Blood-forming Tissues. Miriam P. Finkel, Birute O. Biskis, and Gertrude M. Scribner. BIOLOGICAL AND MEDICAL RESEARCH DIVISION SEMIANNUAL REPORT. 51.
- Finkel, Miriam P. (1959). "Induction of tumors with internally administered isotopes. Radiation Biol. and Cancer." (1959): 322.
- Marshall, John H., & Finkel, M. P. (1959). Autoradiographic dosimetry of mouse bones containing Ca45, Sr90, and Ra226. Radiological Physics Division Semiannual Report, Argonne National Laboratory. ANL-6104: 48–65.
- Finkel, M. P. (1959). Late effects of internally deposited radioisotopes in laboratory animals. Radiation Research Supplement. 265–279.
- Finkel, M. P., & Biskis, B. O. (1959). The induction of malignant bone tumors in mice by radioisotopes. Acta-Unio Internationalis Contra Cancrum. 15.
- Finkel, M. P., Bergstrand, Patricia J., & Biskis, B. O. (1959). CONSEQUENCES OF THE CONTINUOUS INGESTION OF Sr90 BY MICE. BIOLOGICAL AND MEDICAL RESEARCH DIVISION SEMIANNUAL REPORT. (8): 5.

=== 1960 ===
- Finkel, M. P., Bergstrand, P. J., & Biskis, B. O. (1960). The Consequences of the Continuous Ingestion of Sr90 by Mice 1. Radiology. 74(3): 458–467.
- Finkel, M. P., Biskis, B. O., & Bergstrand, P. J. (1960). Radioisotope toxicity: Significance of chronic administration. Radioisotopes in the Biosphere (RS Caldecott and LA Snyder, eds.). 461–473.
- Marshall, J. H., & Finkel, M. P. (1960). Autoradiographic dosimetry of mouse bones containing Ca-45, Sr-90, or Ra-226. II. The sensitive region in the induction of osteogenic sarcomas. ANL: 44–54.
- Marshall, J. H., & Finkel, M. P. (1960). Autoradiographic Dosimetry of Mouse Bones Containing Ca45, Sr90, or Ra226. II. The Sensitive Region in the Induction of Osteogenic Sarcomas. Radiological Physics Division Semiannual Report. January Through June 1960. 44–54.
- Auerbach, Harry S., Lesher, G. A., Sacher, Douglas, Grahn, R., Nebel, R. R., Robertson, No A. Frigerio et al. (1960). Illinois bone tumor death certificate study. Annual report-Division of Biological and Medical Research. Argonne National Laboratory. 7–8.
- Finkel, M. P., & Biskis, B. O. (1960). Radium damage in mouse bone. Annual report-Division of Biological and Medical Research. Argonne National Laboratory. 44–51.
- Finkel, M., Bergstrand, Patricia, & Biskis, Birute. (1960). Latency and growth of osteosarcomas induced by radiostrontium. Annual report-Division of Biological and Medical Research. Argonne National Laboratory. 35.

=== 1961–1964 ===
- Finkel, M. P., Biskis, B. O., Flynn, Robert J., Greco, Isabel L., & Jinkins, P. B. (1961). The toxicity of radioisotopes in dogs: Status in quo. Biological and Medical Research Division Semiannual Report. 38.
- Finkel, M. P., Bergstrand, P. J., & Biskis, B. O. (1961). The Latent Period, Incidence, and Growth of Sr90-Induced Osteosarcomas in CF1 and CBA Mice 1. Radiology. 77(2): 269–281.
- Finkel, M. P., & Biskis, B. O. (1962). Toxicity of plutonium in mice. Health Physics. 8(6): 565–579.
- Finkel, M. P., Bergstrand-Jinkins, Patricia, & Biskis, Birute O. (1962). Induction of osteosarcomas in mice by X-irradiation. BIOLOGICAL AND MEDICAL RESEARCH DIVISION SEMIANNUAL REPORT July through December 1961. 33.
- Finkel, M. P., Jinkins, P. B., & Biskis, B. O. (1962). THE TOXICITY OF Ra226 IN MICE: A PROGRESS REPORT. Biological and Medical Research Semiannual Report. 26.
- Finkel, M. P., Jinkins, P. B., & Biskis, B. O. (1964). Parameters of radiation dosage that influence production of osteogenic sarcomas in mice. National Cancer Institute Monograph. (14): 243–270.

=== 1965–1969 ===
- Finkel, M. P., Biskis, B. O., & Jinkins, P. B. (1966). Virus induction of osteosarcomas in mice. Science. 151(3711): 698–700.
- Finkel, M. P., Jinkins, P. B., Tolle, Janet, & Biskis, B. O. (1966). Serial Radiography of Virus-Induced Osteosarcomas in Mice 1. Radiology 87(2): 333–339.
- Finkel, M. P., Biskis, B. O., & Farrell, C. (1967). Pathogenic effects of extracts of human osteosarcomas in hamsters and mice. Archives of pathology. 84(4): 425–428.
- Finkel, M. P., & Biskis, B. O. (1968). EXPERIMENTAL INDUCTION OF OSTEOSARCOMAS. Argonne National Lab., Illinois.
- Finkel, M. P., Biskis, B. O., & Jinkins, P. B. (1969). Toxicity of radium-226 in mice. Radiation-Induced Cancer. 369–391.
- Finkel, M. P., Biskis, B. O., & Farrell, Corinne. (1969). Nonmalignant and Malignant Changes in Hamsters Inoculated with Extracts of Human Osteosarcomas 1. Radiology. 92(7): 1546–1552.
- Finkel, M. P., & Biskis, B. O. (1969). Osteosarcomas induced in mice by FBJ virus and 90Strontium. Delayed effects of bone-seeking radionuclides (Ed. Mays, C.W., et al.). 417.
- Finkel, M. P., Biskis, B. O., & Jinkins, P. B. (1969). Radiation-induced cancer. IAEA. Vienna. 369.

=== 1970–1979 ===
- Finkel, M. P., & Biskis, B. O. (1970). PATHOLOGIC CONSEQUENCES OF RADIOSTRONTIUM ADMINISTERED TO FETAL AND INFANT DOGS (No. CONF-690501--). Argonne National Lab., Illinois).
- Pritchard, Douglas J., Reilly, Christopher A., & FINKEL, Miriam P. (1971). Evidence for a human osteosarcoma virus. Nature. 234(47): 126–127.
- Finkel, M. P., Biskis, B. O., & Reilly Jr, C. A. (1971). Interaction of FBJ osteosarcoma virus with 90Sr and with 90Sr osteosarcomas. Oncology. (1): 422.
- Reilly, C. A., Pritchard, D. J., Biskis, B. O., & Finkel, M. P. (1972). Immunologic evidence suggesting a viral etiology of human osteosarcoma. Cancer. 30(3): 603–609.
- Finkel, M. P., Biskis, B. O., Greco, Isabel, & Camden, R. W. (1972). Strontium-90 toxicity in dogs: Status of Argonne study on influence of age and dosage pattern. Biomedical Implications of Radiostrontium Exposure (M. Goldman and LK Bustad, Eds.). 285–312.
- Finkel, M. P., Reilly Jr, C. A., Sanders, C. L., Busch, R. H., Ballou, J. E., & Mahlum, D. D. (1973). Observations suggesting the viral etiology of radiation-induced tumors, particularly osteogenic sarcomas (No. CONF-720505--). Argonne National Lab., IL; Battelle Pacific Northwest Labs., Richland, Washington. (USA).
- Pritchard, D. J., Reilly, C. A., Finkel, M. P., & Ivins, John C. (1974). Cytotoxicity of human osteosarcoma sera to hamster sarcoma cells. Cancer. 34(6): 1935–1939.
- Pritchard, D. J., Finkel, M. P., & Reilly Jr, C. A. (1975). The Etiology of Osteosarcoma: A Review of Current Considerations. Clinical Orthopaedics and Related Research. (111): 14–22.
- Lee, Chung K., Chan, Emerson W., Reilly, C. A., Pahnke, Vernon A., Rockus, Gabriele, & Finkel, M. P. (1979). In vitro properties of FBR murine osteosarcoma virus. Experimental Biology and Medicine. 162(1): 214–220.
