= Kansas Academy of Science =

American scientific organization

The Kansas Academy of Science is a public organization for the promotion and promulgation of scientific research in the state of Kansas, United States. It was created as the Kansas Natural History Society at a meeting at Lincoln College (now Washburn University) in Topeka. The first president was Benjamin Franklin Mudge, the former State Geologist and a professor at the Kansas State Agricultural College (now Kansas State University).

In 1870 John Fraser replaced Mudge as president, and suggested that the Society broaden its scope to include all science, and not just natural science. The next year, the Society changed its name to the "Kansas Academy of Science". In 1873 the Society was incorporated by the legislature as a state institution. The legislature placed the academy under the state department of agriculture and charged them with the creation of a science library and the collection of scientific specimens.

== Library ==
The library of the academy was kept in the Capitol Building until 1915 when it was moved along with the library of the Kansas Historical Society into the new Memorial Building with the collections to be managed together. At that time it numbered over 6,000 volumes, most of which were bound journals. That management regime ended up less than satisfactory, and in 1922 the legislature ordered the academy's library to be moved from Topeka to the University of Kansas at Lawrence. In Lawrence the volumes were eventually moved into the Watson Library, although they were kept as a separate collection. At this point, the academy had, for several years, lacked funds to bind their journals, and the collection was not being kept up. So, in 1930, it was sold for $5,000 to various colleges and universities in Kansas.

== Museum ==
Members of the society assiduously collected geological and biological specimens, and the collections were stored in the offices of the State Board of Agriculture. Then they were moved to the basement of the Capitol Building, and about 1912 the museum was moved to the fourth floor of the Capitol. In 1915 it was moved to the Memorial Building; however, the job was done so incompetently that much of its value was destroyed. Over the next couple of years, the remaining specimens were dispersed, and the museum ceased to exist. About 1920 the remaining display cases were sent to the Kansas University art department. Efforts to reestablish the museum were unsuccessful.

== Sources ==
- Blackmar, Frank W. (editor) (1912) "Academy of Science" Kansas: A Cyclopedia of State History Volume 1, Standard Publishing Company, Chicago, pp. 22–23
- Bonwell, C. C. (1968) "The Founding of the Kansas Academy of Sciences" Transactions of the Kansas Academy of Science 71(3): pp. 247–256
- Everhart, M. J. (2006) "Kansas Academy of Science one hundred years ago: The museum" Transactions of the Kansas Academy of Science 109(3/4): pp. 269–270
- Schoewe, W. H. (1938) "The Kansas Academy of Science: Past, Present and Future" Transactions of the Kansas Academy of Science 41: pp. 399–416
- Skelton, Lawrence H. (1998) "A Brief History of the Kansas Academy of Science" Transactions of the Kansas Academy of Science 101(3/4): pp. 140–145
- Wooster, Lyman C. (1937) "Some of the Founders and Workers of the Kansas Natural History Society and the Kansas Academy of Science" Transactions of the Kansas Academy of Science 40: pp. 215–220
