= Eva J. Pell =

American biologist and academic administrator

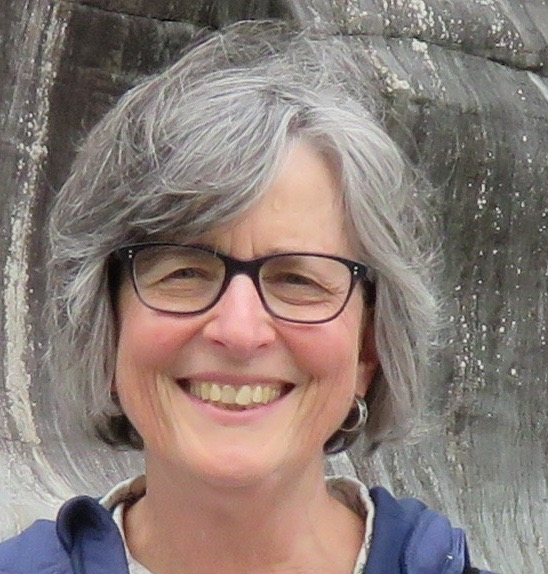
- Born: March 11, 1948 (age 78); New York, New York, US
- Education: City College of New York, Rutgers University
- Known for: Study of the mechanism for ozone-induced accelerated leaf senescence (aging.)
- Scientific career
- Fields: Biology, plant pathology, science administration
- Institutions: Pennsylvania State University, Smithsonian Institution

Eva J. Pell (born March 11, 1948) is a biologist, plant pathologist, and science administrator. Pell's research focused on the physiological and biochemical impacts of air pollutants on vegetation. As a science administrator at Pennsylvania State University and the Smithsonian Institution, Dr. Pell initiated several pan-institutional science institutes. Since leaving the Smithsonian, she is developing a series of adventure stories for elementary school children with the theme rescuing endangered species.

== Early life and education ==
Eva Joy Pell was born in New York, New York. She earned a Bachelor of Science in biology from City College of New York in 1968 and a Ph.D. in plant biology from Rutgers University in 1972.

== Career ==
Eva J. Pell was appointed as assistant professor of Plant Pathology at the Pennsylvania State University in 1973. In 1991, she was named Distinguished Professor of Plant Pathology and in 1995, was named the John and Nancy Steimer Professor of Agricultural Sciences.

Pell's research focused on the physiological and biochemical impacts of air pollutants on vegetation, and her research spanned from the molecular to the ecophysiological. Her work examined several pollutants – sulfur dioxide, acid rain, and ozone – and she is known for her study of the mechanism for ozone-induced accelerated leaf senescence (aging). She is the author or co-author of more than 100 publications and 65 abstracts.

Pell's career as a science administrator began on July 1, 1999, when she was appointed Interim Vice President of Research at Pennsylvania State University, which she served until January 2000. In January 2000, Dr. Pell was appointed vice president for Research and Dean of the Graduate School at Pennsylvania State University. On May 12, 2006, her title was changed to Senior Vice President for Research and Dean of the Graduate School, a position she held until December 31, 2009.

In her role as Senior Vice President for Research, Pell spearheaded the development of cross-disciplinary institutes for life sciences, materials, energy and environment, social sciences, cyber science, and arts and humanities. She oversaw the full development of the Huck Institutes for the Life Sciences, the Materials Research Institute, the Social Science Research Institute, the Penn State Institutes for Energy and the Environment, and the Institute for CyberScience. An outgrowth of that effort included Eva championing the construction of the state-of-the art Millennium Science Complex, home to the Huck Institutes for the Life Sciences and the Materials Research Institute. All six institutes reported directly to her. She was also responsible for sponsored research, compliance and the university's animal research center. In addition, Pell was responsible for the Penn State Research and Technology Transfer Organization, which connects Penn State researchers with industries in order to stimulate economic development. Pell was active in economic development and served on numerous state boards including the Ben Franklin Center of Central and Northern Pennsylvania, the Ben Franklin Technology Development Authority, the Technology Collaborative and the Life Science Greenhouse for Central Pennsylvania. She was also President of the Penn State Research Foundation and the Research Park Management Corp.

As dean of the Penn State Graduate School, Pell oversaw graduate admissions, fellowships, awards, and curriculum and developed several programs at Penn State to increase the number of minority applicants for graduate programs.

Pell's term in the Penn State research office saw a nearly two-fold increase in research expenditures from US$393 million to US$765 million in 2009. According to the National Science Foundation, Penn State ranked ninth nationally among all public and private universities in science and engineering Research & Development expenditures.

On September 9, 2011, the Penn State Board of Trustees on Friday approved the naming of a new lab building as the "Eva J. Pell Laboratory for Advance Biological Research." The 20,000-square-foot building was designed to support immunology and infectious disease research.

Pell worked for Penn State for 36 years before leaving to work as the Under Secretary for Science at the Smithsonian Institution on Jan. 4, 2010. In her role at the Smithsonian, she oversaw the operations of the National Museum of Natural History; the National Air and Space Museum; the National Zoo and its Conservation and Research Center in Front Royal, Va.; the Smithsonian Astrophysical Observatory in Cambridge, Mass.; the Smithsonian Environmental Research Center in Edgewater, Md.; the Smithsonian's Museum Conservation Institute in Suitland, Md.; and the Smithsonian Tropical Research Institute in Panama.

During Pell's tenure at the Smithsonian, The Smithsonian Conservation Biology Institute's opened a state-of-the-art genetics lab at the National Zoo in Washington, D.C. Also, in October 2012, the Smithsonian announced the formation of the Tennenbaum Marine Observatories Network. The project will be the first worldwide network of coastal ecological field sites with the goal of standardizing measurements of biological change.

Pell retired from the Smithsonian Institution in March, 2014. In September 2019, Pell released the first in a series of adventure novels about rescuing endangered species for children ages 9–12, titled ResQ and the Baby Orangutan. The second book in the series, ResQ Takes on the Takhi, was published in 2020, and the third book, ResQ in Panamá: Can We Save The Frogs?, in 2022.

== Personal life ==
Eva J. Pell is married to Ira Pell. They have two grown daughters, Erika Pell '98 Penn State, and Rachel Pell '00 Penn State, and three grandchildren.
