= Nola Anderson Haynes =

American mathematician (1897–1996)

- Born: Nola Lee Anderson; January 9, 1897; Linn County, Missouri, U.S.
- Died: December 21, 1996 (aged 99); Brookfield, Missouri, U.S.
- Burial place: Memorial Park Cemetery, Columbia, Missouri
- Education: University of Missouri
- Occupations: Mathematician and professor
- Known for: PhD in math in the United States before World War II
- Spouse: Eli Stuart Haynes

Nola Anderson Haynes (1897–1996) was an American mathematician and one of the few women to earn her PhD in math in the United States before World War II.

== Biography ==
Nola Lee Anderson was born January 9, 1897, on a farm in 1897 in Linn County, Missouri, as one of four children. Her early education took place in a one-room schoolhouse; she graduated from the high school in Bucklin, Missouri in 1915 and found a job teaching school.

In the fall of 1919, Anderson enrolled at the University of Missouri at age 22, and graduated three years later with a BS in education. In 1922, she started teaching high school and after two years and she took a job teaching mathematics at the Central College for Women in Lexington, Missouri. She returned to the University of Missouri in Columbia, for her master's degree with a major in mathematics and a minor in astronomy. She received her doctorate in 1929, in mathematics and astronomy, under Louis Ingold (1872–1935) with the dissertation An Extension of Maschke's Symbolism. One member of her advisory board was the head of the Astronomy department, Eli Stuart Haynes, who would later become her husband.

In 1930, Anderson joined the faculty at H. Sophie Newcomb Memorial College of Tulane University in New Orleans, as associate professor and acting chair of the department. She left Newcomb in 1938 to get married, and moved back to Columbia, Missouri. In 1943, she returned to the University of Missouri, where she taught in the mathematics department where few women taught at the time. She was hired as an "acting" associate professor because nepotism laws at the time restricted her employment at the University. She later said, "It was not until my husband retired that I got the appointment of associate professor." She remained an associate professor at the University of Missouri from 1946 until in 1967 when she retired at 70, as emeritus associate professor .

== Personal life ==
On July 9, 1938, Anderson and Haynes were married. Nola Haynes became a widow in 1956.

In memory of her late husband, she established the Eli Stuart Haynes and Nola Anderson Haynes Scholarship Fund. In 1995, the Department of Mathematics and the College of Arts & Science presented her with the first Silver Chalk Award.

Nola Anderson Haynes died in Brookfield, Missouri, on December 21, 1996, less than three weeks before her 100th birthday. She was buried in Memorial Park Cemetery, Columbia, Missouri.

== Selected publications ==
She was the author of three articles on her research in geometry:

- "An Extension of Maschke's Symbolism" in the American Journal of Mathematics, 1929
- "The Trigonometry of Hyperspace" in The American Mathematical Monthly, 1929
- "Normals to a Space V _{n} in Hyperspace" in the Bulletin of the American Mathematical Society, 1936

== Memberships ==
According to Judy Green, Haynes was active in several societies.

- President, League of Women Voters, Columbia, 1939–1941
- National Society Colonial Dames American (Role of Honor award 1980)
- Sigma Xi
- Pi Lambda Theta
- Pi Mu Epsilon
