= National Wildlife Health Center =

Agency of the United States Geological Survey

Coordinates: 43.049°N 89.4841°W

The National Wildlife Health Center (NWHC) is a science center of the United States Geological Survey. NWHC is located in Madison, Wisconsin, on a 24-acre plot of land that includes a main building and tight isolation building (TIB). The facility houses Bio-safety Level 3 (BSL-3) and Bio-safety Level 2 (BSL-2) laboratories on site.

The center studies several diseases that affect American wildlife including bat white nose syndrome, chronic wasting disease (CWD), avian influenza, and sylvatic plague, among others.

In addition to the study of disease, NWHC has the capability to diagnose the causes of mass wildlife die-offs. This is done via necropsy and the work of several pathologists, biologists, and other scientists. The scientists are able to run toxicology, heavy metal and tissue analyses to determine cause of death. A notable instance of this capability in use was during the mass die-off of birds, primarily red-winged blackbirds, in Beebe, Arkansas, on December 31, 2010. The NWHC determined the die-off to be the result of blunt trauma, most likely caused when the birds were frightened out of their nests at night by fireworks.

== Honolulu Field Station ==
In addition to the main facility in Madison, Wisconsin, the NWHC maintains a field station in Honolulu, Hawaii. The Honolulu field station is responsible for researching diseases that affect Pacific Ocean wildlife, including birds, sea turtles, and coral reefs. Generally staff for the NWHC Honolulu field station numbers around four staff, either federal employees or contractors.
