= School of Public Health (Indiana University Bloomington) =

Graduate school in Bloomington, Indiana, US

Coordinates: 39.17218°N 86.51843°W

School of Public Health-Bloomington
- Type: Public school of public health
- Established: 2012; 14 years ago
- Parent institution: Indiana University
- Dean: David Allison
- Students: 2494 (2019-2020)
- Undergraduates: 2085 (2019-2020)
- Postgraduates: 409 (2019-2020)
- Location: Bloomington, Indiana, United States
- Campus: Small city
- Website: publichealth.indiana.edu

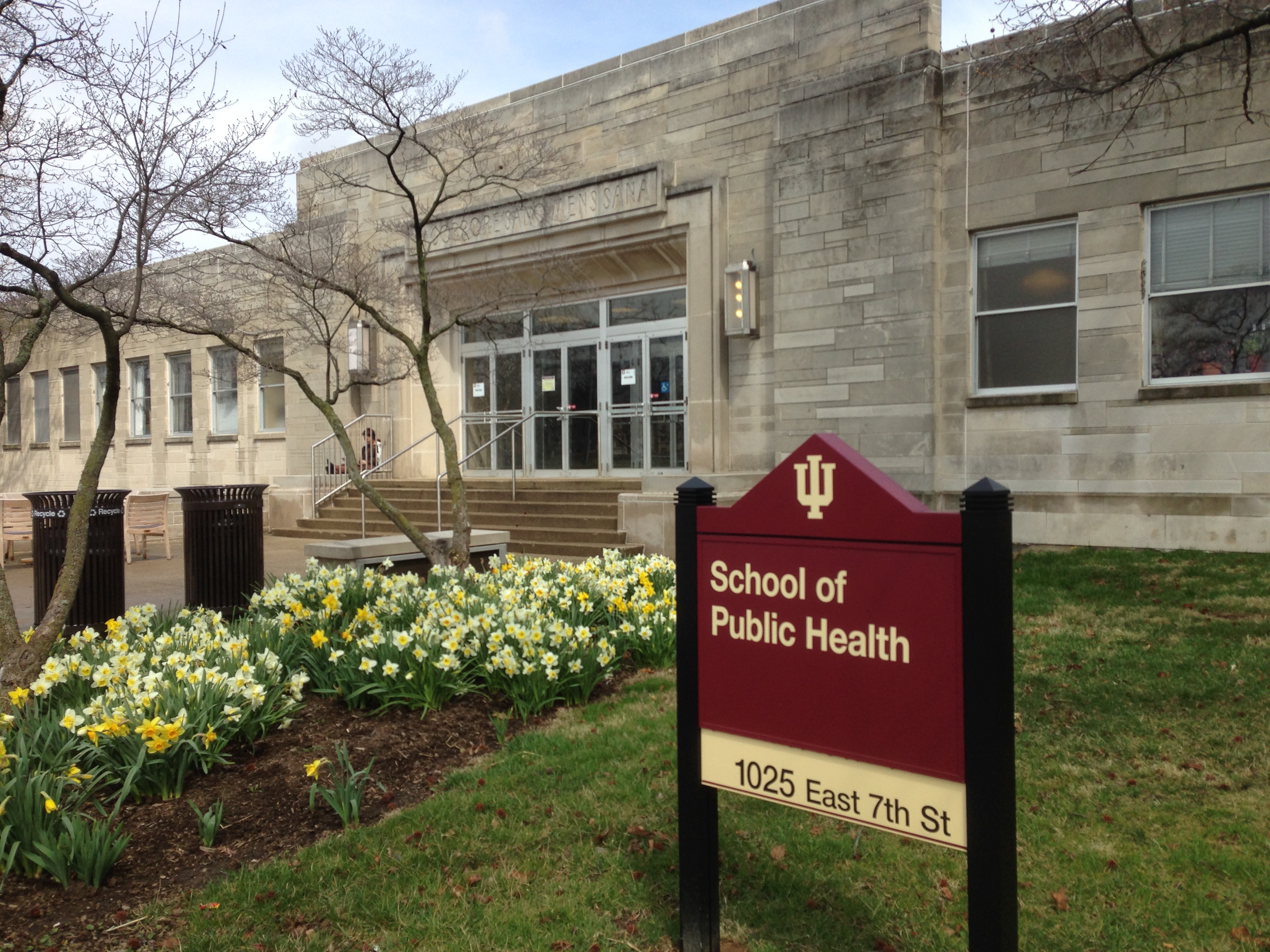
Indiana University School of Public Health-Bloomington

The School of Public Health-Bloomington is the school of public health of Indiana University Bloomington in Bloomington, Indiana, United States.

Until 2012, it was the School of Health, Physical Education, and Recreation (HPER). Now, the School of Public Health on IU's Bloomington campus enrolls 2,790 undergraduate and graduate students, offers 34 different degrees, and has five academic departments. In 2020, the School of Public Health-Bloomington was reaccredited by the Council on Education for Public Health.

== History ==
The precursor to the School of Public Health-Bloomington, the School of Health, Physical Education, and Recreation, was founded in 1946. In 2012, the school became the School of Public Health-Bloomington. The school earned accreditation from the Council on Education for Public Health in 2015. It has the oldest Master of Public Health program, established in 1969, in the state of Indiana.

A history book, A Legacy Transformed, about the school's origins and transformation into the IU School of Public Health-Bloomington, was published in 2016.

Pamela S. Whitten was elected Indiana University's 19th president and the first woman to serve as president of the university on April 16, 2021. Dr. Whitten was appointed a tenured professor in the School of Public Health-Bloomington.

== Academics ==
The school offers Bachelor of Science, Master of Science, Master of Public Health, and Ph.D. degrees.

The school is organized into five departments:

- Applied Health Science
- Environmental and Occupational Health
- Epidemiology and Biostatistics
- Kinesiology
- Health & Wellness Design

In the 2021 Best Graduate Schools survey by U.S. News & World Report, the school was ranked the 41st school of public health in the U.S.

== Notable people ==
=== Faculty ===
- David B. Allison, current dean
- Hobie Billingsley, diving coach
- James Counsilman, swimming coach
- Ruth C. Engs, applied health scientist
- Debby Herbenick, sexual health expert
- Bob Knight, basketball coach
- James M. Ridenour, former director of the National Park Service
- Pamela S. Whitten, Indiana University's 19th president
- Jerry Yeagley, soccer coach

=== Alumni ===
- Larry R. Ellis, former commander of the U.S. Army Forces Command
- Dick Enberg, sportscaster
- Mark Hertling, former commanding general of the U.S. Army Europe and the Seventh Army
- Laura Kelly, 48th governor of Kansas
- Robin Milhausen, sexual health expert
- Juwan Morgan, professional basketball player
- Victor Oladipo, professional basketball player
- Frank Pyke, sports scientist
- Nikos Stavropoulos, professional basketball player
- Sage Steele, ESPN television anchor
- George Taliaferro, first African American football player selected in the National Football League draft
- Christian Watford, professional basketball player
- Harrison Wilson Jr., basketball coach
