= Graduate Women in Science =

American women's science organization

- GWIS
- Founded: May 24, 1921; 105 years ago Cornell University
- Type: Professional
- Affiliation: American Association for the Advancement of Science
- Status: Active
- Emphasis: Science and math
- Scope: International
- Motto: "United in Friendship through Science"
- Pillars: Connect, Lead, and Empower
- Colors: the Spectrum
- Symbol: Benzene, thunderbolt, Nabla
- Publication: GWIS Connect and GWIS Lead
- Chapters: 30+
- Members: 1,000 active
- Former name: Sigma Delta Epsilon
- Headquarters: P.O. Box 7 Mullica Hill, New Jersey 08062; United States
- Website: www.gwis.org

Graduate Women in Science (GWIS), formerly known as Sigma Delta Epsilon (ΣΔΕ), is an international professional organization for women in science. It was established as a scientific women's fraternity in 1921 at Cornell University, United States. It played an important role for women scientists for some fifty years when they were not allowed membership in most mainstream scientific organizations. GWIS is a non-profit 501(c)(3) organization with over 1,000 active members and more than 30 active chapters.

== History ==
Sigma Delta Epsilon was established at Cornell University in Ithaca, New York by Adele Lewis Grant on May 24, 1921. It was founded as a fraternity for women pursuing graduate degrees in the sciences. Its stated purpose was "to further interest in science, recognize women involved in science, and unite them through friendship".

Initially, Sigma Delta Epsilon had 25 student members and eight honorary members, who were professional women who had achieved recognition in science. Its first officers were Adele Lewis Grant, president; Katherine Van Winkle, vice president; Josephine Overton Sonders, secretary; and Hazel Elizabeth Branch, treasurer. Sigma Delta Epsilon had a fraternity house where its members could live.

In 1922, a similar local group for women at the University of Wisconsin–Madison agreed to merge with Sigma Delta Epsilon, establishing a national fraternity. Its purpose was "to further interest in science, to provide a fraternity for the recognition of women in science, and to bring them together in a fraternal relationship".

Sigma Delta Epsilon was incorporated in the state of New York in April 1922. It held its first national convention on April 20, 1922. It joined the American Association for the Advancement of Science (AAAS) as an associate member in 1936 and as an affiliated member in 1939. In this era when mainstream scientific organizations did not give women full membership, Sigma Delta Epsilon "filled an important niche", according to Margaret Rossiter. Hazel Fox was the only woman on the AAAS Council at the time, as a representative of Sigma Delta Epsilon.

One of the organization's early activities was collecting money to distribute to other members needing research funds. In 1931, Sigma Delta Epsilon established a formal Fellowships Fund. Its first research fellowship was awarded in 1941. In 1970, Eloise Gerry established a fellowship, the first within the organization to be funded by a single individual.

By the early 1970s, the fraternity was struggling from an increasing anti-fraternity sentiment on college campuses and competition from previously male-only organizations. Hoping to counter this, the fraternity changed its name to Sigma Delta Epsilon Graduate Women in Science in December 1971. This was shortened to Graduate Women in Science (GWIS) on April 21, 2016. An international chapter was established in 2013.

== Symbols ==
The motto of Graduate Women in Science is "United in Friendship through Science". Its guiding principles or pillars are Connect, Lead, and Empower.

Its badge is a Nile key with the Greek letters ΣΔΕ in black enamel on its crossbar. Attached to the key are a benzene ring, a thunderbolt, and the nabla. Its colors are those of the spectrum.

== Activities ==
Graduate Women in Science is a non-profit 501(c)(3) organization that works to connect, lead, and empower women in science. Its mission is "building a global community to inspire, support, recognize, and empower women in science." It has over 1,000 members and dozens of chapters spread across the United States, as well as an international chapter that was established in 2013. Its national office is in Mullica Hill, New Jersey.

Graduate Women in Science offers grants, awards, and fellowships. It serves an international network of women scientists and promotes the participation and representation of women in science-related events. The GWIS National Meeting is held annually in June. It also sponsors mentoring, webinars, and seminars featuring its member's research. The society publishes a monthly newsletter, GWIS Connect, and GWIS Lead, a periodical that features women leaders in science.

== Membership ==
Membership in the Graduate Women in Science is open to anyone who has at least a bachelor's degree in a scientific discipline and engineering, or equivalent professional experience.

== Chapters ==
Graduate Women in Science has chartered more than 50 chapters and has more than 30 active chapters.

== See also ==
- List of organizations for women in science
- List of women's associations
- Professional fraternities and sororities
- Women in science
