= List of Kappa Sigma members =

Kappa Sigma is an American collegiate social fraternity founded at the University of Virginia in 1869. This is a list of some of the notable members of Kappa Sigma.

== Academics ==
- Steven C. Beering (Chi), president, Purdue University
- Alexander Bondurant (Upsilon), classicist and educator, University of Mississippi
- William Cade (Tau), president, University of Lethbridge, behavioral ecologist
- Bryan Coker (Phi), president, Maryville College
- Paul Farmer (Eta Prime), medical anthropologist, physician. Professor and chair of the Department of Global Health and Social Medicine at Harvard Medical School
- Gary Forsee (Beta-Chi), president, University of Missouri System
- John C. Futrall (Xi), president, University of Arkansas, 1913–1939
- Christian Gauss (Alpha-Zeta), literary critic and professor, Princeton University
- Irvine W. Grote (Alpha-Iota), University of Tennessee at Chattanooga. Noted Chemist and inventor of Rolaids.
- Ernest Hartsock (Alpha), professor of poetics, Oglethorpe University
- John Herbert Hollomon Jr. (Gamma-Pi), president, University of Oklahoma; Assistant Secretary, United States Department of Commerce
- Manley Ottmer Hudson (Alpha-Omega), professor, Harvard University
- Robert Nozick (Alpha Tau), American philosopher
- William N. Ruud (Delta-Mu), president, Shippensburg University
- Paul Rudolph (Beta-Eta), chair of the Department of Architecture, Yale University
- John W. Ryan (Delta-Sigma), president emeritus, Indiana University
- D. M. Smith (Kappa), chair, mathematics, Georgia Institute of Technology
- Don C. Sowers, economist, sociologist, and physicist, University of Oregon and University of Colorado Boulder
- Lyon Gardiner Tyler (Zeta), president, College of William & Mary

== Art ==
- Herblock (Alpha-Chi), cartoonist, Pulitzer Prize winner
- Mort Walker (Beta-Gamma), cartoonist, Beetle Bailey
- Gluyas Williams (Gamma-Eta), cartoonist, The New Yorker

== Business ==
- Craig Barrett (Beta-Zeta), chairman and CEO, Intel
- Talmage Cooley (Zeta), founder & CEO of Democracy.com
- John Donahoe (Gamma-Epsilon), CEO of eBay and current CEO of Nike
- Robert Eaton (Gamma-Omicron), chairman DaimlerChrysler AG
- Mike Eskew (Chi), CEO, UPS
- Gary Forsee (Beta-Chi), president and CEO of Sprint Nextel
- Dan Fredinburg (Mu-Delta), Google executive
- William Hewlett (Beta-Zeta), founder, Hewlett Packard
- William Hinson (Alpha-Tau), owner, WPHinson Trading
- Richard Johnson (Alpha-Phi), founder and president, HotJobs
- Albert Bond Lambert (Zeta), early aviator, sponsor of The Spirit of St. Louis, namesake of Lambert International Airport
- Robert Krebs (Beta-Zeta), CEO, Burlington Northern
- Robert W. Lundeen (Gamma-Sigma), chairman of the board, Dow Chemical
- Scottie Mayfield (Alpha-Tau), president, Mayfield Dairy Farms
- George J. Maloof, Jr. (Kappa-Alpha), co-owner of the Palms Hotel and Casino and the Sacramento Kings
- Nate Morris (Alpha-Eta), entrepreneur
- Alan Mulally (Gamma-Omicron), president and CEO Ford Motor Company
- Bobby Murphy (Beta-Zeta), co-founder of Snapchat
- John Olin (Alpha-Kappa), chairman Olin Corporation
- Spencer Truman Olin (Alpha-Kappa), executive Olin Corporation
- John R. Patrick (Beta-Iota), IBM vice president and innovative leader in the technology industry
- Richard Rainwater (Tau), Financier
- Willard F. Rockwell (Alpha Delta), founder of Rockwell International
- Cyrus R. Smith (Tau), president of American Airlines
- John F. Smith Jr. (Gamma-Delta), president, General Motors
- Evan Spiegel (Beta-Zeta), co-founder and CEO of Snapchat
- Todd Wagner (Beta-Theta), Broadcast.com co-founder

== Entertainment ==
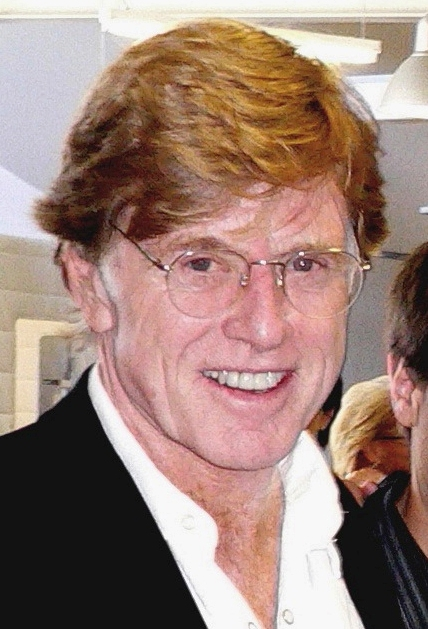
Robert Redford

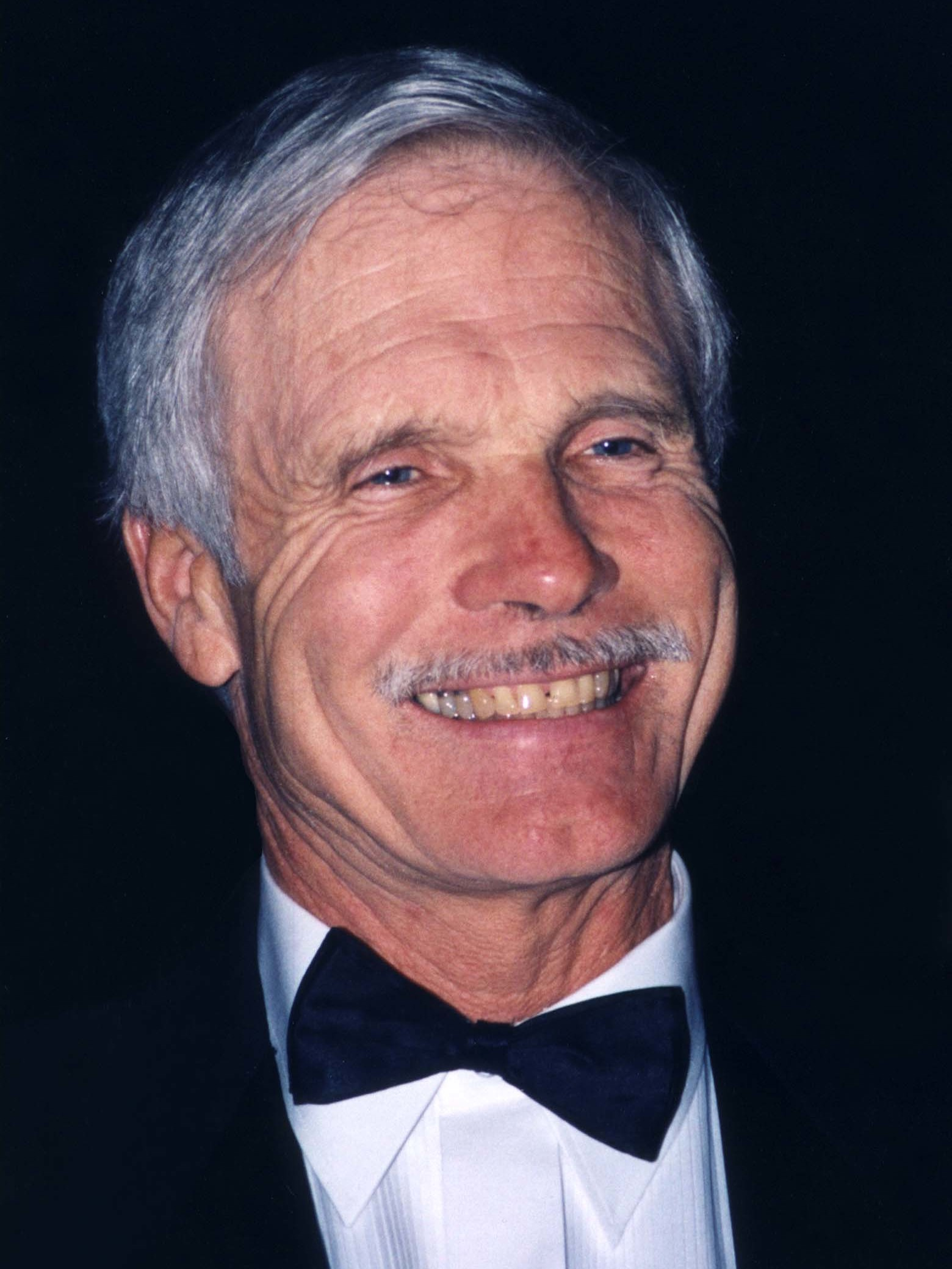
Ted Turner

=== Film, radio, television ===
- Johnny Mack Brown (Beta), actor known for Billy the Kid
- John Brotherton (Gamma-Sigma), actor known for Fuller House and The Conjuring
- Craig Conover (Kappa-Chi), actor known for Southern Charm
- Richard Crenna (Delta-Eta), actor known for Rambo
- Sam Donaldson (Epsilon-Xi), television journalist with ABC News
- Steve Kroft (Gamma-Iota), television journalist with 60 Minutes
- John Driscoll (Kappa Phi), actor known for Guiding Light, and The Young and the Restless.
- Chip Gaines (Lambda-Tau), television personality known for Fixer Upper
- Chris Harrison (Theta Psi), actor known for The Bachelor
- Dennis Haskins (Alpha-Iota), actor known for Saved By the Bell
- Gordon Jump (Gamma-Chi), actor known for WKRP in Cincinnati, portrayed the Maytag repairman
- Wink Martindale (Epsilon-Pi), television game show host
- Craig Melvin (Alpha-Nu), television journalist with NBC
- Edward R. Murrow (Gamma-Mu), television journalist
- David Nelson (Delta Eta), actor known for Ozzie and Harriet
- Mark Neveldine (Delta-Phi), director, screenwriter, producer, actor
- Mike O'Malley (Beta-Kappa), actor known forYes, Dear, Nickelodeon GUTS, Glee
- Evan Puschak (Mu-Psi), video essayist
- Robert Redford (Gamma-Tau), Academy Award-winning actor, director, founder of the Sundance Film Festival
- Steve Sabol (Beta-Omega), president of NFL Films
- Gailard Sartain (Epsilon-Mu), actor
- Greg Smith (Theta-Beta), actor known for Everwood
- Kerr Smith (Alpha-Lambda), actor known for Dawson's Creek
- Ted Turner (Beta-Alpha), media mogul and founder of TNT, TBS, and CNN; owner of the Atlanta Braves
- Michael C. Williams (Xi-Gamma), actor known for The Blair Witch Project
- Bill Wittliff (Tau), screenwriter known for The Perfect Storm
- John Ward (Lambda), University of Tennessee sportscaster

=== Music ===
- Bill Anderson (Beta-Lambda), singer and songwriter
- Derek Andersen (Mu-Delta), EDM DJ and producer, part of the duo Slander
- Jimmy Buffett (Epsilon-Nu), singer, businessman best known for his Margaritaville franchise
- Hoagy Carmichael (Beta-Theta), composer and movie star
- AJ Castillo (Xi-Delta), Tejano recording artist, accordionist, singer, performer, and producer
- Kevin Griffin (Gamma), lead singer and musician, Better Than Ezra
- Josh Kelley (Delta-Xi), musician
- Scott Land (Mu-Delta), EDM DJ and producer, part of the duo Slander
- Paul "P.H." Naffah (Rho), drummer, The Refreshments, Roger Clyne and the Peacemakers
- Bobby Pulido (Lambda-Psi), musician, Tejano recording artist
- Samuel Ramey (Gamma-Chi), operatic bass, actor
- Sam Vogel (Pi-Beta), EDM DJ and producer Jauz

== Journalism and literature ==
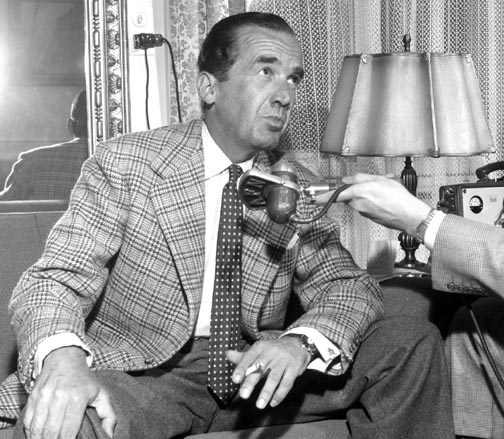
Edward R. Murrow

- Richard Allin (Omega), author and journalist with the Arkansas Gazette
- Marquis Childs (Beta-Rho), journalist with the St. Louis Post-Dispatch
- Stewart Mandel (Epsilon-Delta), journalist Sports Illustrated
- Drew Pearson (Pi), columnist
- Anthony Sadler (Nu-Lambda), author known for defending the 2015 French train terrorist attack
- Lowell Thomas (Beta-Omicron), Journalist, Commentator

== Law ==
- William Lee Estes (Upsilon), judge of the United States District Court for the Eastern District of Texas (1920–1930)
- H. F. Gierke III, (Delta-Mu), justice of the North Dakota Supreme Court (1983–1991); chief judge of the United States Court of Appeals for the Armed Forces (1991–2006), chief Judge (2004–2006)
- Edward H. Johnson, (Epsilon Omega), judge of the Georgia Court of Appeals (1992–2010), chief judge (1999–2000)
- David E. Kendall (Alpha-Pi), Attorney to President Bill Clinton
- James Berry King (Xi), Oklahoma Attorney General (1931–1935)
- David McCain (Delta-Delta), justice of the Supreme Court of Florida (1970–1975)
- Dustin McDaniel (Xi), Arkansas Attorney General (2007–2015)
- Edwin L. Pittman (Epsilon-Nu), justice of the Supreme Court of Mississippi (1989–2004), chief justice (2001–2004)
- Steven W. Taylor (Gamma-Psi), justice of the Supreme Court of Oklahoma (1994–), chief justice (2011–2013)

== Military ==
- Edward Allworth (Gamma-Sigma), U.S. Army. Medal of Honor recipient
- Burwell B. Bell (Alpha-Iota), U.S. Army general
- Kyle Carpenter (Chi-Omega), U.S. Marine Corps. Medal of Honor recipient
- Frank L. Culin Jr. (Gamma-Rho), U.S. Army major general, World War II commander of the 87th Infantry Division
- Frank Freyer (Alpha-Tau), 14th Naval Governor of Guam; Chief of Staff of the Peruvian Navy
- William E. Gortney (Lambda-Lambda), Commander, U.S. Naval Forces Central Command, vice admiral
- Cary T. Grayson (Nu), United States Navy surgeon and admiral, chairman of the American Red Cross
- Paul V. Hester (Delta-Xi), general and commander, Pacific Air Forces
- Thomas George Lanphier, Jr. (Beta-Zeta), World War II fighter pilot
- Richard C. Mangrum (Beta-Psi), Lt. General, first Marine Aviator to receive the "Gray Eagle Award"
- Hal Moore (Alpha-Eta), U.S. Army lieutenant general, Distinguished Service Cross recipient
- Samuel C. Phillips (Delta-Gamma), Commander and general, Air Force Systems Command from 1973 to 1975
- Gordon Arthur Stanley (Gamma-Alpha), U.S. Navy ace

== Politics ==
=== Governors ===
- Thomas L. Bailey (Alpha-Upsilon), governor of Mississippi (1944–1946)
- David M. Beasley (Kappa-Upsilon), governor of South Carolina (1995–1999)
- Millard F. Caldwell (Zeta), governor of Florida (1945–1949)
- Forrest C. Donnell (Beta-Gamma), governor of Missouri (1945–1951)
- Lee S. Dreyfus (Beta-Epsilon), governor of Wisconsin (1979–1983)
- Paul Fannin (Gamma-Rho), governor of Arizona (1959–1965)
- Frank Freyer (Alpha-Tau), Naval Governor of Guam (1910–1911); Chief of Staff of the Peruvian Navy
- Dwight Green (Alpha-Pi), governor of Illinois (1941–1949)
- Beauford H. Jester (Tau), governor of Texas (1947–1949)
- Joseph B. Johnson (Alpha-Lambda), governor of Vermont (1955–1959)
- John Ellis Martineau (Xi), governor of Arkansas (1927–1928)
- Robert Evander McNair (Chi-Omega), governor of South Carolina (1965–1971)
- Harry Nice (Alpha-Alpha), governor of Maryland (1935–1939)
- Paul E. Patton (Beta-Nu), governor of Kentucky (1995–2003)
- George C. Peery (Omicron), governor of Virginia (1934–1938)
- Sonny Perdue (Beta-Lambda), governor of Georgia (2003–2011)
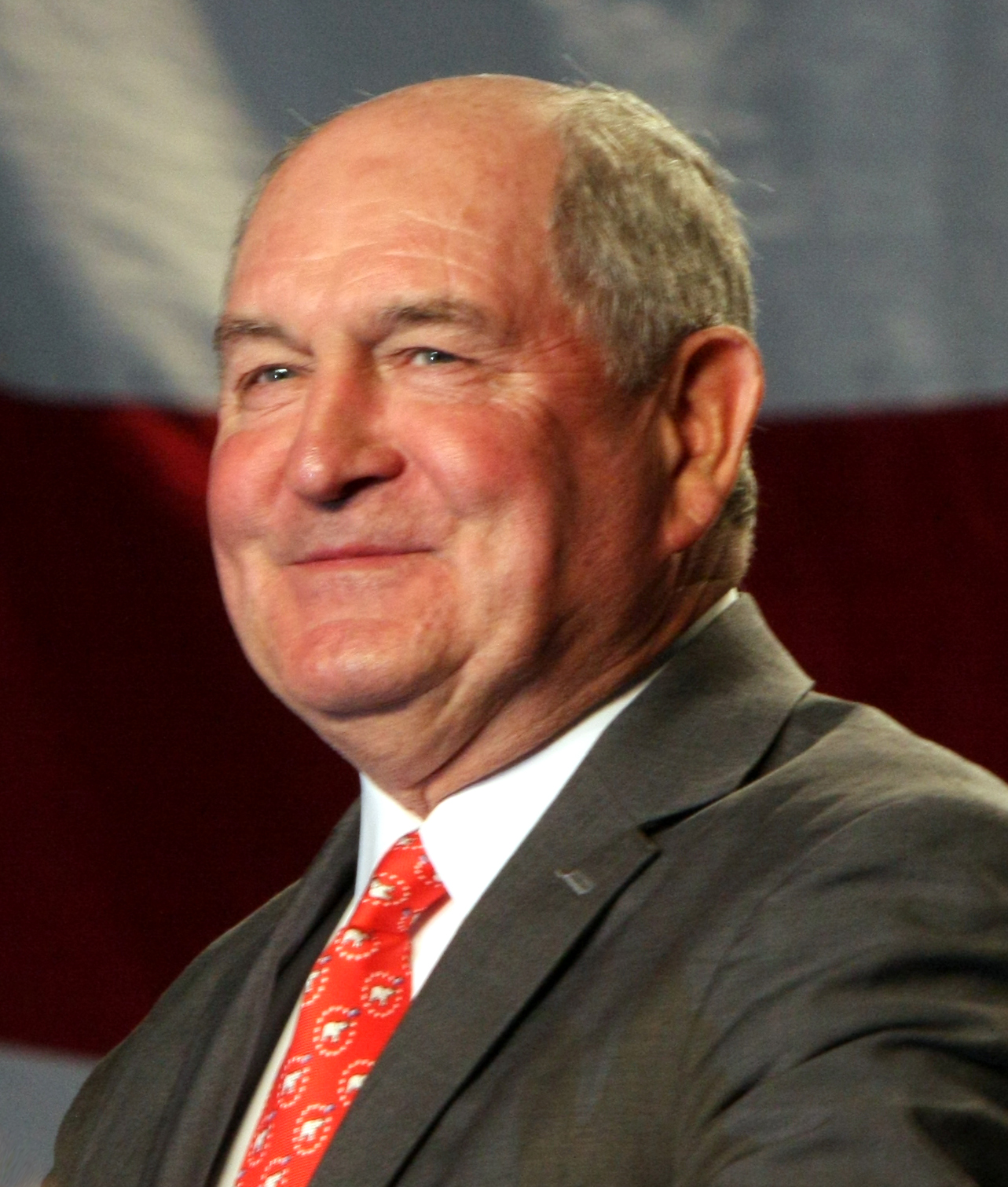
  Sonny Perdue
- Xenophon Overton Pindall (Xi), governor of Arkansas (1907–1908)
- Ruffin G. Pleasant (Gamma), governor of Louisiana (1916–1920)
- James Hubert Price (Mu), governor of Virginia (1938–1942)
- David C. Treen (Sigma), governor of Louisiana (1980–1984)

=== U.S. Senate ===
- John Boozman (Xi), United States Senator and United States House of Representatives
- Richard Burr (Delta-Omega), United States Senator and United States House of Representatives
- Bob Dole (Gamma-Omicron), Senate Majority Leader; 1996 Republican Party Presidential Nominee
- Paul J. Fannin (Gamma-Rho), United States Senator (1959–1987)
- Estes Kefauver (Lambda), United States Senator (1949–1963)
- John L. McClellan (Xi), United States Senator (1943–1977)
- John G. Tower (Iota), United States Senator (1961–1985)

=== U.S. House of Representatives ===
- William V. Alexander (Xi), United States House of Representatives, Arkansas (1966–1992)
- Tom Allen (Alpha-Rho), United States House of Representatives, Maine (1997–2009)
- Ed Bethune (Xi), United States House of Representatives, Arkansas (1979 –1985)
- Dan Boren (Theta), United States House of Representatives, Oklahoma (2005–2013)
- Douglas Bosco (Theta-Delta), United States House of Representatives, California (1983–1991)
- Dante Fascell (Epsilon-Beta), United States House of Representatives, Florida (1955–1993)
- William Shields Goodwin (Xi), United States House of Representatives, Arkansas (1911–1921)
- Michael P. Guest (Delta-Chi), United States House of Representatives
- Samuel B. Hill (Xi), United States House of Representatives, Washington (1923–1936)
- Frank Horton (Gamma), United States House of Representatives, New York (1963–1993)
- Robert Hurt (Upsilon), United States House of Representatives, Virginia (2011–2017)
- Ernest J. Istook, Jr. (Theta-Psi),United States House of Representatives, Oklahoma (1993–2007)
- Mike Johnson (Gamma), Speaker of the United States House of Representatives
- Ken Lucas (Beta-Nu), United States House of Representatives, Kentucky (1999–2005)
- John L. McClellan (Xi), United States House of Representatives, Arkansas (1932–1939)
- Charlie Melancon (Epsilon-Chi), United States House of Representatives, Louisiana (2005–2011)
- John Murtha (Beta-Delta), United States House of Representatives, Pennsylvania (1974–2010)
- Archibald E. Olpp (Beta-Iota), United States House of Representatives, New Jersey (1921–1923)
- Vic Snyder (Theta-Delta), United States House of Representatives, Arkansas (1997–2011)
- Joe D. Waggonner (Epsilon-Gamma), United States House of Representatives, Louisiana (1961–1978)

=== State and local officeholders ===
- Bryce Bennett (Delta-Omicron), Montana Senate (2019–2021), Montana House of Representatives (2011–2019)
- John M. Bransford, (Xi), Arkansas House of Representatives (1937–1942)
- Lee Arthur Clayton (Xi), Arkansas State Treasurer (1961–1963)
- G. Ernest Cunningham, (Xi), Arkansas House of Representatives (1969–1996)
- Kevin Faulconer (Epsilon-Iota), Mayor of San Diego (2014–2020)
- Ryan Gatti (Gamma), Louisiana State Senate (2016–2020)
- John W. Greer, Jr. (Alpha), Georgia State Senate (1959–1960)
- Matt Gurtler, (Rho Prime), Georgia House of Representatives (2017–2021)
- Claris "Crip" Hall, (Xi), Secretary of State of Arkansas (1937–1961)
- Ken Helm (Theta-Delta), Oregon House of Representatives
- Mike Layton, (Delta-Epsilon), Toronto City Councillor (2010–2022)
- J. C. Long (Gamma-Omicron), Kansas House of Representatives (1983–1993)
- Lloyd C. McCuiston, Jr., (Xi), Arkansas House of Representatives (1961–1994)
- John L. V. Murphy (Alpha-Alpha), Maryland House of Delegates
- Wally Nesbitt (Delta-Epsilon), Member of Parliament (Canada) (1953–1973)
- Rob Patridge (Theta-Delta), Oregon House of Representatives (1999–2005)
- Sam Reed (Gamma-Mu), Secretary of State of Washington (2000–2013)
- Barry Williamson (Xi), Chairman of the Railroad Commission of Texas (1993–1999)

=== Other political figures ===
- Herman B. Baruch (Zeta), U.S. Ambassador to the Netherlands and U.S. Ambassador to Portugal
- John Ehrlichman (Delta Nu), White House Domestic Affairs Advisor, White House Counsel; convicted of the conspiracy, obstruction of justice, and perjury in the Watergate scandal
- William Gibbs McAdoo (Lambda), United States Secretary of the Treasury (1913–1918)
- Larry M. Speakes (Delta-Xi), Acting White House Press Secretary
- Ardeshir Zahedi (Epsilon-Kappa), Iran's Ambassador to the United States and United Kingdom; Foreign Minister of Iran

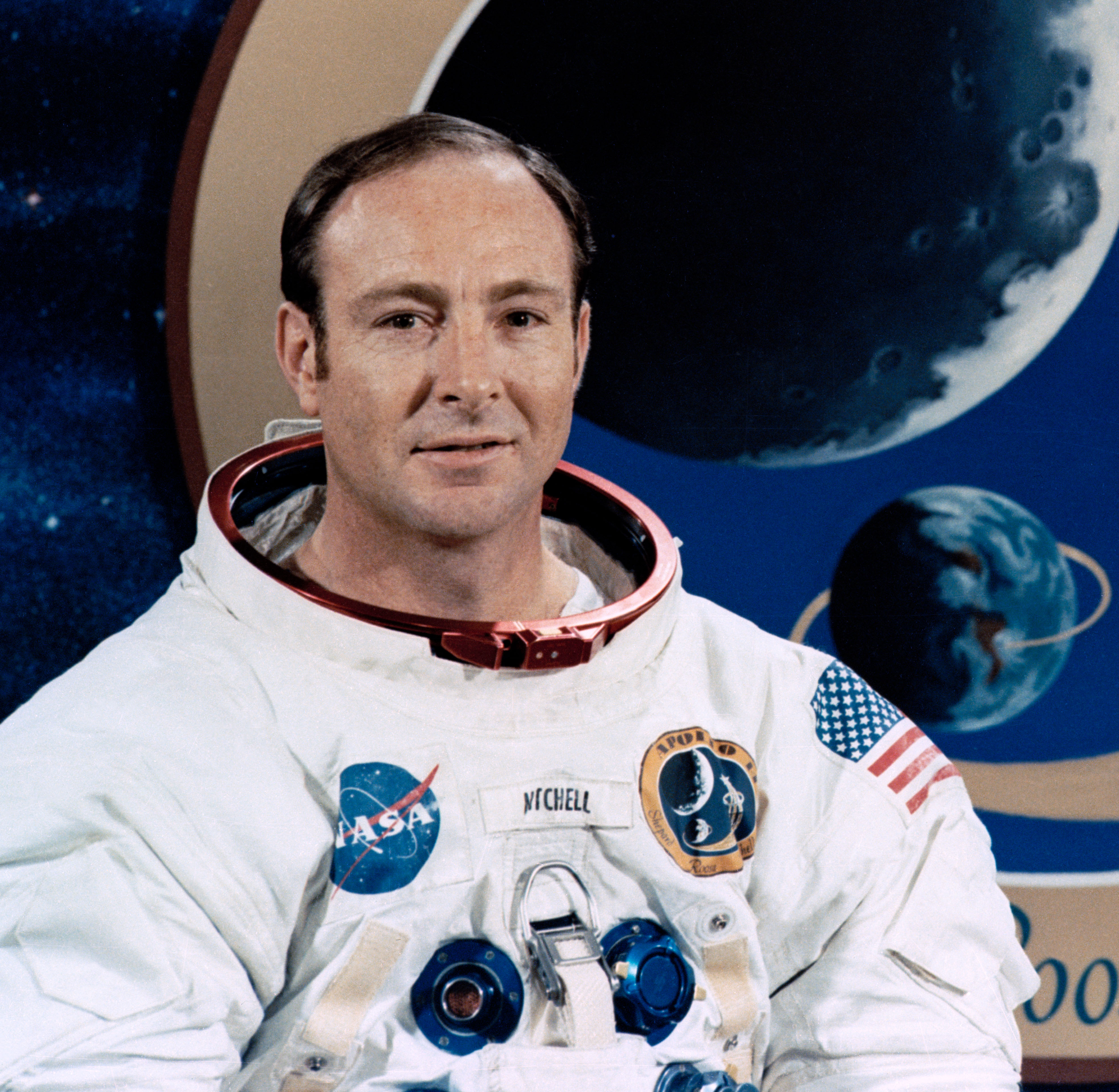
Edgar Mitchell

== Science and medicine ==
- Lee Berger (Kappa), Paleoanthropologist and National Geographic Explorer, awarded the First National Geographic Prize for Research and Exploration
- John Covert Boyd (Zeta), military surgeon designated by President Theodore Roosevelt to incorporate the American National Red Cross
- Denton Cooley (Tau), founder of the Texas Heart Institute, performed first heart transplant in the United States
- Ernest William Goodpasture (Kappa), pathologist and physician
- Edwin Hubble (Gamma-Beta), astronomer, namesake of Hubble Space Telescope
- Edgar D. Mitchell (Delta-Alpha), Astronaut and Lunar Module Pilot on Apollo 14, the sixth person to walk on the Moon
- Gen. Samuel C. Phillips (Delta-Gamma), University of Wyoming. NASA Apollo Program Director.
- Lore Alford Rogers, USDA dairy scientist and bacteriologist.

== Sports ==
=== Baseball ===
- Fred Beebe (Alpha-Gamma), pitcher (1906–1916)
- Boyd Cypert (Xi), 3rd Baseman (1914)
- Chuck Dobson (Gamma-Omicron), pitcher (1966–1975)
- Boo Ferriss (Delta-Chi), pitcher (1945–1950)
- Gerry Hannahs (Xi), pitcher (1976–79)
- George Huff (Alpha-Gamma), manager of Boston Red Sox (1907); athletic director at University of Illinois (1901–1935)
- Carl Lundgren (Alpha-Gamma), pitcher (1902–1909)
- Andy MacPhail (Beta-Pi), president of baseball operations (2007–)
- Charlie Monfort (Delta-Sigma), owner, Colorado Rockies
- Big Jeff Pfeffer (Alpha-Gamma), pitcher (1905–1911)
- Steve Rogers (Epsilon-Mu), pitcher (1973–1985)
- Ray Tanner (Chi-Omega), head baseball coach University of South Carolina (1997–2012), Director of Athletics University of South Carolina (2012–present)
- Cecil Upshaw Jr. (Epsilon), pitcher (1966–1975)

=== Basketball ===
- Rick Barry (Epsilon-Beta), (1965–1980) basketball player, Hall of Fame
- Hec Edmundson (Gamma-Theta), basketball coach University of Washington (1920–1947)
- Rollie Massimino (Alpha-Lambda), head basketball coach at Villanova University
- Branch McCracken (Beta-Theta), head basketball coach Indiana University Basketball Hall of Fame
- Dan Peterson (Alpha-Gamma), head basketball coach University of Delaware, Chile National Team, Bologna Virtus, Milan Olimpia

=== Football ===
- William Alexander (Alpha-Tau), head football coach Georgia Tech (1920–1944)
- Dike Beede (Delta-Alpha), football coach at Youngstown State University and inventor of the penalty flag (1937–1972)
- Jim Benton (Xi), wide receiver, played 9 years for the Cleveland Rams and Chicago Bears. All-America in 1937, he was a member of the NFL 1940s All-Decade Team.
- Cam Cameron (Beta-Theta), head NFL football coach (2007); head football coach Indiana University (1997–2001)
- Lloyd Carr (Beta-Gamma), head football coach University of Michigan (1995–2007)
- Tommy Casanova (Gamma), safety (1974–1977) Pro Bowl
- Richard Cunningham (Xi), linebacker, center and offensive tackle, (1967–73) Buffalo Bills, Houston Oilers, and Philadelphia Eagles
- Richie Cunningham (Epsilon-Chi), kicker (1997–2002) Pro Bowl
- Fisher DeBerry (Alpha-Nu), head football coach Air Force Academy(1984–2006)
- Dan Dierdorf (Beta-Gamma), sports commentator, NFL player
- Tay Gowan (Lambda-Epsilon), cornerback, (2021–Present)
- Ron Guenther (Alpha-Gamma), head football coach at North Central College and athletic director University of Illinois at Urbana–Champaign
- Howard Harpster (Delta-Alpha), quarterback, College Football Hall of Fame
- Ted Hendricks (Epsilon-Beta), defensive end, (1969–1983) Pro Football Hall of Fame
- James Kent Hull (Delta-Chi), center, (1983–1996) Pro Bowl
- Bert Jones (Gamma), quarterback, (1973–1982) Pro Bowl
- Jerry Jones (Xi), owner, Dallas Cowboys
- Greg Landry (Gamma-Delta), quarterback, (1968–1984) Pro Bowl
- Jimmye Laycock (Nu), head football coach (1980–) College of William & Mary
- Jim Lindsey (Xi), Half-Back, played for the Minnesota Vikings from 1966 to 1972, including Super Bowl IV against the Kansas City Chiefs.
- John Michelosen (Gamma-Omega), quarterback, (1933–1937); head coach of the Pittsburgh Steelers (1948–1951); head coach of Pitt (1955–1965)
- Elmer Oliphant (Chi), Purdue and West Point football player
- Steve Owens (Gamma-Kappa), (1970–1974) 1969 Heisman Trophy Winner
- Erk Russell (Beta-Eta), head football coach (1964–1969) University of Georgia, Georgia Southern University
- Daniel "Rudy" Ruettiger, football player, best known from the movie "Rudy"
- Dick Schafrath (Alpha-Sigma), offensive lineman, (1959–1971) Pro Bowl
- Paul Schwegler (Beta-Psi), tackle, College Football Hall of Fame
- Clyde Scott (Xi), All-American halfback, College Football Hall of Fame, Olympic silver medalist in the 1948 Summer Olympics, professional with the Philadelphia Eagles and the Detroit Lions
- Brian Sipe (Epsilon-Iota), quarterback (1974–1983), 1980 MVP
- Jerry Stovall (Gamma), running back (1963–1971), Pro Bowl; head coach of LSU (1980–1983)
- Norm Van Brocklin (Gamma-Alpha), quarterback, football coach Pro Football Hall of Fame
- Tad Wieman (Alpha-Zeta), head football coach University of Michigan (1927–1928) College Football Hall of Fame
- Brian Young (Epsilon-Xi), defensive tackle (2000–2008)
- Bob Zuppke (Alpha-Gamma), head football coach University of Illinois (1913–1941) College Football Hall of Fame

=== Golf ===
- Jay Haas (Delta-Omega), professional golfer (1976–)
- Peter Jacobsen (Gamma-Alpha), professional golfer (1976–)
- Albert Bond Lambert (Zeta), Amateur golfer and namesake of Lambert–St. Louis International Airport
- Curtis Strange (Delta Omega), professional golfer (1976–) World Golf Hall of Fame
- Lanny Wadkins (Delta-Omega), professional golfer (1971–) World Golf Hall of Fame
- Robert Wrenn (golfer) (Delta-Omega), professional golfer (1982–1998), 1987 Buick Open Winner

=== Racing ===
- Ryan Ellis (Kappa-Phi), NASCAR Xfinity Series driver
- Chris Festa (Epsilon-Sigma), Firestone Indy Light driver
- Phil Hill (Delta-Eta), Formula One driver

=== Soccer ===
- Lamar Hunt (Delta-Pi), owner, Kansas City Chiefs, Columbus Crew, Kansas City Wizards, and F.C. Dallas Founder of the American Football League, Co founder North American Soccer League, and Major League Soccer Pro Football Hall of Fame
- Eriq Zavaleta (Beta-Theta), Soccer player for the Seattle Sounders (2013–present)

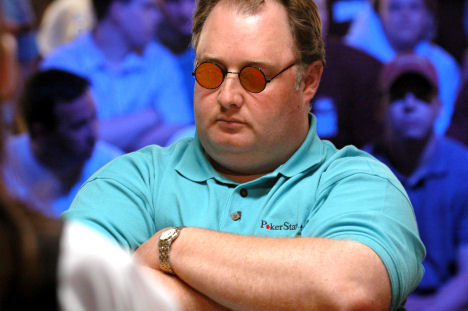
Greg Raymer

=== Other ===
- Ray Barbuti (Gamma-Iota), Olympic runner
- Scott Davidson (Xi-Lambda), professional table tennis player
- David Fee (Alpha-Chi), USA Rugby Player/Coach (2002–present)
- Francis Hunter, professional tennis player, Olympic medalist
- George Kliavkoff (Mu-Psi), Commissioner of Pac-12 Conference (2021–2024)
- Denis Margalik (Xi-Nu), figure skater
- Greg Raymer (Beta-Chi), winner World Series of Poker 2004
- Gus Sonnenberg (Gamma-Epsilon), world heavyweight champion
- Robert Steadward (Epsilon-Alpha), founding president of the International Paralympic Committee; Officer of the Order of Canada
- Louis Zamperini (Delta-Eta), Olympic runner, WWII POW, inspirational speaker

== Man of the Year ==
Every year, the Supreme Executive Committee of Kappa Sigma selects one notable alumnus as Man of the Year. Those selected are figures who have made significant public contributions in areas including politics, the military, entertainment, sports, etc.

Name	Chapter	School	Year
Cyrus R. Smith	Tau	University of Texas	1937
Lowell J. Thomas	Beta-Omicron	University of Denver	1938
Warren R. Austin Jr	Alpha-Lambda Colony	University of Vermont	1939
Frederick H. Albee	Alpha-Rho	Bowdoin College	1940
Edward R. Murrow	Gamma-Mu	Washington State University	1941
James H. Macia Jr	Gamma-Rho	University of Arizona	1942
Jack E. Manch	Upsilon	Hampden-Sydney College	1942
Roy C. Osgood	Alpha-Eta	George Washington University	1943
Dwight H. Green	Alpha-Pi	Wabash College	1944
Clinton A. Pierce	Alpha-Gamma	University of Illinois	1945
Ernest W. Goodpasture	Kappa	Vanderbilt University	1946
Beauford H. Jester	Tau	University of Texas	1947
Edwin P. Hubble	Gamma-Beta	University of Chicago	1948
Cason J. Callaway	Zeta	University of Virginia	1949
Rev Fred P. Corson, Ret	Beta-Pi	Dickinson College	1950
Estes Kefauver	Lambda	University of Tennessee/Knoxville	1951
Donald H. Mc Laughlin	Beta-Xi	University of California/Berkeley	1952
Hoagland H. Carmichael	Beta-Theta	Indiana University	1953
Thomas J. Williams	Xi	University of Arkansas	1954
Arnold M. Johnson	Gamma-Beta	University of Chicago	1955
Henry Symonds	Beta-Zeta	Stanford University	1956
Francis S. Van Derbur	Beta-Omicron	University of Denver	1957
Willard F. Rockwell Jr	Alpha-Delta Colony	Pennsylvania State University	1958
Joseph D. Flask	Beta-Theta	Indiana University	1959
John M. Olin	Alpha-Kappa	Cornell University	1960
Spencer T. "Tom" Olin	Alpha-Kappa	Cornell University	1960
Senator John G. Tower	Iota	Southwestern University	1961
Senator Paul J. Fannin	Gamma-Rho	University of Arizona	1962
James B. Fisk	Gamma-Pi	Massachusetts Institute of Technology	1963
Denton A. Cooley	Tau	University of Texas	1964
Reno Odlin	Beta-Psi	University of Washington	1965
William A. Whitfield	Gamma-Lambda	Iowa State University	1966
Benjamin S. Gilmer	Beta-Eta	Auburn University	1967
James H. Binns	Beta-Omicron	University of Denver	1968
General Samuel C. Phillips, USAF	Delta-Gamma	University of Wyoming	1969
Senator Robert J. Dole	Gamma-Omicron	University of Kansas	1970
Edgar D. Mitchell	Delta-Alpha	Carnegie Mellon University	1971
Lamar Hunt	Delta-Pi	Southern Methodist University	1972
Joseph D. Waggonner Jr	Epsilon-Gamma	Louisiana Tech University	1973
John B. Kelly Jr.	Alpha-Epsilon	University of Pennsylvania	1974
John W. Ryan	Delta-Sigma Colony	University of Utah	1975
Ardeshir Zahedi	Epsilon-Kappa	Utah State University	1976
Richard F. Barry III	Epsilon-Beta	University of Miami	1977
William R. Hewlett	Beta-Zeta	Stanford University	1978
Lee S. Dreyfus	Beta-Epsilon	University of Wisconsin	1979
David C. Treen	Sigma	Tulane University	1980
John M. Allin	Omega	University of The South	1981
Larry M. Speakes	Delta-Xi Colony	University of Mississippi	1982
Fred M. Russell	Kappa	Vanderbilt University	1983
Charles L. Massey Jr	Xi	University of Arkansas	1984
Lewis W. Lehr	Alpha-Psi	University of Nebraska/Lincoln	1985
Paul H. Henson	Alpha-Psi	University of Nebraska/Lincoln	1986
Robert W. Lundeen	Gamma-Sigma	Oregon State University	1987
Mort Walker	Beta-Gamma	University of Missouri	1988
Dante B. Fascell	Epsilon-Beta	University of Miami	1989
E. Fay Jones Jr	Xi	University of Arkansas	1990
Russel L. Wiener	Phi	Rhodes College	1991
Samuel Donaldson	Epsilon-Xi	University of Texas/El Paso	1992
Jerral W. Jones	Xi	University of Arkansas	1993
John F. Smith Jr.	Gamma-Delta	University of Massachusetts	1994
Robert J. Eaton	Gamma-Omicron	University of Kansas	1994
Robert D. Krebs	Beta-Zeta	Stanford University	1995
Richard E. Rainwater	Tau	University of Texas	1996
Pierson M. Grieve Jr	Epsilon-Delta	Northwestern University	1997
Philip S. Anderson Jr	Xi	University of Arkansas	1998
Col. Ronald J Webb	Beta-Theta	Indiana University	1999
Raymond J. Lane, J	Gamma-Phi	West Virginia University	2000
Paul E. Patton	Beta-Nu	University of Kentucky	2001
General Paul V. Hester	Delta-Xi	University of Mississippi	2002
Todd R. Wagner	Beta-Theta	Indiana University	2003
Michael L. Eskew	Chi	Purdue University	2004
Sonny Perdue	Beta-Lambda	University of Georgia	2005
Martin C. Petersen	Rho	Arizona State University	2006
Alan Mulally	Gamma-Omicron	University of Kansas	2007
Richard Burr	Delta-Omega	Wake Forest University	2008
Gary D. Forsee	Beta-Chi	University of Missouri - Rolla (now Missouri University of Science & Technology)	2009
Jim Morris	Beta-Theta	Indiana University	2010
Brian O'Dwyer	Alpha-Eta	George Washington University	2011
Bill Whittliff	Tau	University of Texas	2012
William E. Gortney	Lambda-Lambda	Elon University	2013
Craig R. Barrett	Beta-Zeta	Stanford University	2014
R.D. Burck	Tau	University of Texas	2015
Mike O'Malley	Beta-Kappa	University of New Hampshire	2016
Bert "Tito" Beveridge II	Tau	University of Texas	2017
Chris Harrison	Theta-Psi	Oklahoma City University	2018
James W. Stuckert	Beta-Nu	University of Kentucky	2019
Senator Robert J. Dole	Gamma-Omicron	University of Kansas	2020
Lloyd Carr	Beta-Gamma	University of Missouri	2021
Fisher DeBerry	Alpha-Nu	Wofford College	2021
Lanny Wadkins	Delta-Omega	Wake Forest University	2022
Craig Melvin	Alpha-Nu	Wofford College	2023
D. Wayne Lukas	Beta-Epsilon	University of Wisconsin-Madison	2024
Mike Johnson	Gamma	Louisiana State University	2025
