= Eskew =

Eskew is a surname. Notable people with the surname include:

- Jack Eskew (1940–2016), American arranger and orchestrator
- Michael L. Eskew (born 1949), American businessman
- Tucker Eskew (fl. 1983–2011), American political and communications strategist
