= Scott Davidson =

Scott Davidson may refer to:

- Scott Davidson (lacrosse) (born 1982), lacrosse player
- Scott Davidson (musician), publisher, former keyboards player with Bros and the Pet Shop Boys, and ex-chairman of Bristol City F.C.
- Scott Davidson (legal scholar) (born 1954), Vice-Chancellor of Newman University Birmingham
- Scott Davidson (1968–2001), New York City firefighter and father of Pete Davidson

== See also ==
- Scot Davidson, Canadian 21st century politician
- Thomas Scott Davidson (1858–1933), Canadian politician
- Scotty Davidson (1892–1915), Canadian ice hockey player
