= Mary Sinclair (disambiguation) =

Mary Sinclair (1922–2000) was an American actress

Mary Sinclair may refer to:

- Mary P. Sinclair (1918–2011), American environmental activist
- Mary Craig Sinclair (1882–1961), writer and the wife of Upton Sinclair
- Mary Emily Sinclair (1878–1955), American mathematician
- May Sinclair, pseudonym of Mary Amelia St. Clair (1863–1946), a popular British writer
