= Ronan Malloy =

Fictional character

- The Young and the Restless character
- Portrayed by: Jeff Branson (2010–12)
- Duration: 1986, 2010–12
- First appearance: August 12, 1986
- Last appearance: November 28, 2012
- Introduced by: H. Wesley Kenney (1986); Maria Arena Bell (2010)
In-universe information
- Other names: Aiden Lansing
- Occupation: FBI Agent
- Father: Jimmy
- Mother: Nina Webster
- Half-brothers: Chance Chancellor
- Grandmothers: Florence Webster
- Nephews: Dominic Chancellor (legal)

Ronan Malloy is a fictional character from the American CBS soap opera The Young and the Restless. Introduced by the former head writer Maria Arena Bell, the role was portrayed by Jeff Branson. After the character's debut, it was revealed that Ronan was, in fact, the child that was stolen from Nina Webster (Tricia Cast) many years before. The character then went on to have romances with Heather Stevens (Eden Riegel), Chloe Mitchell (Elizabeth Hendrickson), and Phyllis Summers (Michelle Stafford).

Branson's first stint ended in February 2011, but he returned shortly after that in August before leaving again in February 2012. The actor's most recent stint on the soap opera was from June 26 to November 28, 2012. Branson's portrayal has received a positive response, for which he received a Daytime Emmy Award nomination in 2013.

== Casting ==
Branson's casting for the role was announced by multiple sources in April 2010. Branson has previously been recognized for his roles as Jonathan Lavery on ABC's All My Children and Shayne Lewis on Guiding Light. On-Air On-Soaps noted that he would be reunited with two of his ex co-stars from Guiding Light, John Driscoll (Chance Chancellor, who would eventually be revealed to be Ronan's brother) and Marcy Rylan (Abby Newman). A first look photo of Branson on set of the series was released by Soap Opera Network on June 14, 2010. Branson made his debut on June 22. He departed in February 2011, however it was later announced that Branson was to return on August 2, 2011. However, by that December it was confirmed that Branson was again to leave The Young and the Restless, departing on February 7, 2012. In May 2012, it was announced that Branson would be returning as Ronan on June 26, 2012.

In November 2012, news broke that the actor would again exit the soap after a six-month stint. Speaking out on his departure, which was never given full recognition onscreen, Branson stated: "It was a contract that was only supposed to last six months and it came to an end. They didn’t show any interest in wanting me to stay. We could have talked about that, but I can’t control that. I’m just currently doing both CSI and CSI: NY right now...I’m staying in the CBS family."

== Development ==
=== Characterization and family reveal ===
Ronan was described as "sexy, mysterious and strong", a far cry Branson's previous roles. Head writer at the time Maria Arena Bell stated: "Jeff will be playing in what I believe will be a real breakout role for him over the summer. It’s a small-term story arc. I want to keep the story specifics under wraps because [it's a doozy]." Prior to his story developing, Global Regina wrote that he "has a secret that could changes the lives of many Genoa City residents". The secret turned out to be Ronan being the long lost son and brother of established characters, Nina Webster (Tricia Cast) and Chance Chancellor (John Driscoll).

Upon his second return to the series, Branson told Maria Arena Bell that he wanted more depth and dimension to his storyline other than just the "same cop rigmarole where you’re doing police procedural stuff and interrogation scene after interrogation scene." He said that he wanted to explore the relationship with Nina, stating: "There is a lot in that storyline with Nina that hasn’t been scratched yet. I really love working with Tricia Cast. I feel such genuine, searing emotions every time we work together. Since we haven’t gotten into the Nina/Ronan thing, I told Maria I would like to see a lot more of it this time and she agreed." Ronan's relationship with his mother, however, hasn't come to fruition yet.

=== Relationships ===
Ronan has been involved with Chloe Mitchell (Elizabeth Hendrickson). Of their relationship, Branson said: "[Elizabeth] and I have known each other for years and I think Chloe/Ronan thing is nice, too because it brings out a different side of Ronan." He noted that being with Chloe was a way for Ronan to "drop the frosty, crusty exterior he puts on because Chloe really gets under his skin, but in a good way." Of this relationship with Heather Stevens, who was re-cast with Jennifer Landon, Branson stated: "I think this will bring another dimension to her character, which means the whole Ronan and Heather can be revisited again." Both Heather and Chloe had also been romantically involved with Ronan's brother, Chance Chancellor (John Driscoll).

Ronan has also had a sexual relationship with Phyllis Summers (Michelle Stafford), a long-running character on the series. A writer from On-Air On-Soaps, commenting on his second return, wrote: "We also know that Ronan and Phyllis had some steamy scenes last time in Genoa City!" Of the pairing and working with Branson, Stafford said: "I love Jeff Branson so much, I cannot even tell you. I really loved working with him." She also thought that they were a good couple at a time where her ex Nicholas Newman (Joshua Morrow) wasn't as good to her, stating: "Yeah, I think they were a good couple. Ronan was really special to Phyllis because he treated her well. Nick was bad to her, and she really was falling in love with Ronan and then he ended things with her so abruptly, but she did not believe him." Additionally, she noted that she was only with Ronan not to get close, but ended up falling for him."

However, they did end up reconnecting the following year. She was married to Nick at the time and cheated on him with Ronan; Phyllis later regretted this, feeling like she had made a huge mistake. Phyllis' daughter Summer (Haley King) walked in on them having sex, and despises Ronan and her mother because of this. Luke Kerr of Zap2It noted that "Ronan, unlike her husband, had been there for her" while she was facing trial for nearly killing Christine and Paul twenty years ago. Before this, Kerr had previously written that Phyllis and Ronan's "attraction has been boiling beneath the surface". Wanting revenge on Ronan, Summer creates a fake alias on Faceplace (the show's version of Facebook) and cyber bullying a boy named Jamie (Daniel Polo), a person Ronan is mentoring. During an interview with TV Guide, the show's head writer Joshua Griffith stated: "Summer is in such a screwed-up state over the divorce of her parents that she misguidedly decides to hurt Ronan by hurting this kid he cares so much about" despite feeling that Jamie was an okay person. Ronan's relationship with Phyllis has been met with popularity from viewers, who requested more scenes between the two.

=== 2012 departure ===
Following his November 2012 departure after his contract expired and executive producer Jill Farren Phelps showed "no interest" in having him re-sign, Branson was disappointed with the lack of his storyline development. Of the lack of airtime for the storyline with Tricia Cast as Nina, he said "I feel like a big ball was dropped there and I don’t know who was responsible. Tricia Cast is a powerhouse of an actress. I deeply wish that she and I had more time. There’s so much story there that was never touched…so much. You could still bring the Chance character back for it. I’ve told Jill Farren Phelps that if she wants to call me, I’m right by the phone. If I come back, I would more than anything play out a story with Tricia Cast". The actor also was disappointed with how the Phyllis and Ronan storyline ended, he wanted to do it "properly" and said "I think was the way it was going...it was more loving and real. More than just hooking up and having beer and pizza. There was real potential there." He also exited at the peak of a cyberbullying plot featuring Summer and Jamie, and explained "That was frustrating for me. But again, things were out of my control."

== Storylines ==
He was born onscreen on August 12, 1986, as the son of Nina Webster; his father was a man from her past named Jimmy. Nina had been living with Rose DeVille who ran a black market baby-snatching ring, unbeknownst to Nina, and the baby was stolen from her hands at birth and raised by two adoptive parents who named him Aiden Lansing.

Years later, he returned to Genoa City under the name Ronan Malloy. Ronan was first partners with Chance Chancellor at the Genoa City Police Department; the two hated each other. Ronan was soon painted as a shady cop in cahoots with Detective Sidney "Sid" Meeks and District Attorney Owen Pomerantz. It was found out that he was the long lost son of Nina Webster; having been stolen at birth from her by Rose DeVille. This made Chance his maternal brother. It was also soon revealed that Ronan was an undercover cop working to protect Heather Stevens from her notorious fellow members of the Justice Department. Chance, who was also working to protect Heather, cheated on his fiancée, Chloe Mitchell. Chloe became romantically involved with Ronan to make Chance jealous. Chloe discovered that Ronan was Nina's long lost son, and urged him to inform his mother, but he refused. Even after the two of them admitted to using each other, there were still feelings left, and they continued their involvement with one another.

In later events, Ronan "accidentally" shot Chance. Nina, Paul, Chloe, and Heather rushed in just as he was shot and pronounced dead on the spot. Many devastated family members and friends of Chance, including Chloe, were outraged at Ronan for this, without knowing the full truth. It was revealed days later that Chance faked his death for his own protection. His parents were made aware that he was still alive, and he was sent to the Witness Protection Program. When Ronan tried to get Chloe back, she rejected him, still believing that Chance was dead and he was the reason. Heather noticed that there was something wrong with Ronan's health. He told her to mind her business, but she refused. He later passed out and she took him to hospital. It was revealed that he had a liver condition. After being confronted by Heather and her father Paul, Ronan admitted that Chance was well and alive in the Witness Protection Program. It was revealed that Ronan's biological father was a man named Jimmy. Jimmy was killed by the same disease that plagued Ronan. Nina then finally discovered that Ronan was her lost son. Ronan needed a liver transplant, and since his brother was a match, Chance left the Witness Protection Program to donate part of his. Following his surgery, Ronan was taken away by the FBI and disappeared from town. His family was upset with him for leaving soon after they had finally reunited.

Ronan returned to Genoa City, where he was hired as the lead investigator in the murder of Diane Jenkins. Those he left behind were still angry at the way he left them. Nina even told him she didn't consider Ronan her son. Ronan and Chloe re-connected and had sex. Chloe wanted answers as to why he left, but he refused to tell her. Ronan continued to taunt and question Genoa City residents who were suspects in Diane's murder, including Ashley Abbott. Ronan had a brief fling with Phyllis Newman, who was also a suspect. By February, Ronan announced to Chloe that he was leaving town on another assignment. Nina was devastated, though before he left, he sent her a package, containing the book she wrote with a note inside stating that he loves her, bringing Nina to tears as he called her "Mom" for the first time. Ronan said goodbye to everyone before officially closing the Diane Jenkins murder investigation.

Ronan returned to town at the request of Victor Newman to locate his daughter Abby, who had been supposedly kidnapped by Carmine Basco. However, Abby staged the entire thing as a publicity stunt. Ronan stayed in Genoa City after the death of Ricky Williams, becoming an investigator in his death and the attempted murder charges on Phyllis for striking Paul Williams and Christine Blair with a car back in 1994.

Although not seen on screen, Ronan is mentioned in January 2014 during an episode where Michael Baldwin makes a call to find information about the Medical Examiner who performed the autopsy on Carmine Basco

== Reception ==
"We're all about The Young and the Restless's newest bad boy, Ronan Malloy — he's a mystery wrapped in an enigma wrapped in one seriously attractive package. And whether he's conspiring with Cricket, kissing Chloe, or fighting Chance in the rain, actor Jeff Branson always makes Ronan cool."

— Megan Lynn of SoapNet praising the addition of Branson to the cast (2010)

After the announcement of Branson's casting, Megan Lynn of SoapNet wrote, "Is there a busier casting department than The Young and the Restless's?" After the character's debut, she wrote, "We're so into Nina's long-lost son with a fake identity." Upon Ronan's debut, Sara Bibel of Xfinity immediately speculated that he was the son of Nina Webster (which turned out to be true). Bibel described the potential storyline as an "awesome pay-off" and wrote: "I have absolutely no idea what the writers have planned, but I know what I would like to see. Ronan is perfectly set up to be the character I have been waiting most of my life to meet: Nina’s long lost son." In a separate article, Bibel described Ronan as "far sexier" when comparing him to his brother, Chance.

Adam Hughes of Yahoo! TV reported that Branson had become a fan favorite, calling him a "crowd-pleasing detective", and that was the reason for his return in August 2011. He wrote: "Ronan's story is a typically twisted tale of intrigue, misunderstanding, betrayal, and redemption. The basic gist is that he was stolen from his mother, Nina Webster when he was just a baby and promptly disappeared from the show's landscape." Hughes also wrote of Ronan returning to solve Diane Jenkins' (Maura West) murder, saying: "All of this is great theater, and you can bet that producers and writers will milk the story for all its worth, potentially allowing Branson the opportunity to cultivate his character into something more permanent." When Branson's exit in November 2012 was announced, Jamey Giddens of Zap2it wrote: "Jeff Branson has had more stints on The Young and the Restless than Sharon Newman in the funny farm." He also said that it was a "bummer" to see Branson leave, as he thought the character's relationship with Phyllis was "smoking hot". In 2013, Branson received a Daytime Emmy Award nomination for Outstanding Supporting Actor in a Drama Series for his portrayal of Ronan.
