= Culler =

Culler is a surname. Notable people with the surname include:

- David Culler (born 1959), computer scientist
- Dick Culler (1915–1964), baseball shortstop
- Glen Culler (1927–2003), professor of electrical engineering
- Marc Culler (born 1953), American mathematician
- Jonathan Culler (born 1944), Professor of English at Cornell University
