= Mary Landers =

American mathematician

Mary Kenny Landers (née Mary Virginia Kenny, February 5, 1905 – November 18, 1990) was an American mathematician who taught for many years at Hunter College. She was also known as "an early advocate of academic collective bargaining".

== Early life and education ==
Mary Kenny was born on February 5, 1905, in Fall River, Massachusetts, one of six children of an Anglo-Irish mailman. After attending public school in Fall River, she became a student at Brown University in 1922. Beyond mathematics, her interests at Brown included violin and debate. After graduating in 1926, she became an Anne Crosby Emery fellow at Brown and earned a master's degree in mathematics there in 1927.

She continued to take graduate courses at Columbia University from 1928 to 1930, and then in 1933 began graduate work at the University of Chicago, with an initial year in residence and then continuing during the summers. She completed her Ph.D. in 1939 at the University of Chicago. Her dissertation, The Hamilton-Jacobi Theory for the Problems of Bolza and Mayer, was jointly supervised by Gilbert Ames Bliss and Magnus Hestenes; it concerned the calculus of variations.

== Career and later life ==
Kenny became a temporary mathematics instructor at Hunter College in 1927, with her appointment there becoming permanent a year later. In 1932, she married Aubrey Wilfred Landers Jr., a fellow mathematics student at Brown who had also taken a position at Hunter College.

She taught at Hunter College for almost 50 years, moving through the academic ranks as an assistant professor in 1947, associate professor in 1958, and full professor in 1964. At Hunter College, she helped develop a program in computer science within the Departments of Mathematics and Science. She also served as secretary of the Legislative Conference of the City University of New York academic staff from 1959 until its 1972 merger with the United Federation of College Teachers. After the merger, she continued as co-secretary of the new merged organization and co-chair of its Hunter College branch. She retired as professor emerita in 1975.

She died on November 18, 1990, of colon cancer, at Rhode Island Hospital.

== Recognition ==
Landers was named a Fellow of the American Association for the Advancement of Science in 1958. She was also a fellow of the New York Academy of Sciences.

Her papers are kept in the collections of the Hunter College library.
