= Magnus Hestenes =

American mathematician (1906–1991)

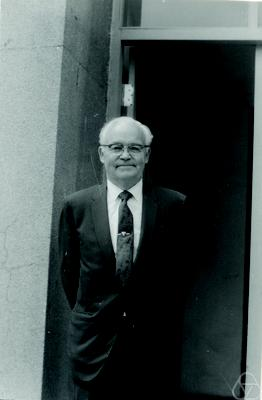
- Born: February 13, 1906; Bricelyn, Minnesota, US
- Died: May 31, 1991 (aged 85); Los Angeles, California, US
- Education: University of Chicago
- Known for: Augmented Lagrangian method Conjugate gradient method
- Children: David Hestenes
- Awards: Guggenheim Fellowship (1954)
- Scientific career
- Fields: Mathematics
- Workplaces: University of California, Los Angeles
- Thesis: Sufficient Conditions for the General Problem of Mayer with Variable End-Points
- Doctoral advisor: Gilbert Bliss
- Doctoral students: Glen Culler; William Karush; Mary Landers; Richard Tapia; Jesse Wilkins, Jr.

Magnus Rudolph Hestenes (February 13, 1906 – May 31, 1991) was an American mathematician best known for his contributions to calculus of variations and optimal control. As a pioneer in computer science, he devised the conjugate gradient method, published jointly with Eduard Stiefel.

== Biography ==
Born in Bricelyn, Minnesota, Hestenes graduated with a B.S. in 1927 from St. Olaf College and with an M.A. in 1928 from the University of Wisconsin–Madison. He earned his Ph.D. at the University of Chicago in 1932 under Gilbert Bliss. His dissertation was titled "Sufficient Conditions for the General Problem of Mayer with Variable End-Points." After teaching as an associate professor at Chicago, in 1947 he moved to a professorship at UCLA. He continued there until his retirement in 1973, and during that time he served as department chair from 1950 to 1958. While a professor, Hestenes supervised the thesis research of 34 students, among them Glen Culler, Richard Tapia and Jesse Wilkins, Jr.

Hestenes received Guggenheim (1954) and Fulbright awards, was a vice president of the American Mathematical Society, and was an invited speaker at the 1954 International Congress of Mathematicians in Amsterdam.

He is the father of mathematician and physicist David Hestenes.

He died on May 31, 1991, in Los Angeles, California.

== Selected publications ==
- Hestenes, Magnus Rudolph (1928). Path of a Rotating Sphere. University of Wisconsin–Madison. (M.A. thesis)
- ——— (1966). Calculus of Variations and Optimal Control Theory. Wiley. ISBN 9780471374701.
- ——— (1975). Optimization Theory: The Finite Dimensional Case. Wiley. ISBN 9780471374718.
- ——— (1980). Conjugate Direction Methods in Optimization. Springer. ISBN 9783540904557.
- Landesman, Edward M.; ——— (1992). Linear Algebra for Mathematics, Science, and Engineering. Prentice Hall. ISBN 9780135295618.
