= Chance Chancellor =

- The Young and the Restless character
- Conner Floyd as Chance Chancellor
- Portrayed by: Penn Badgley (2000–2001); John Driscoll (2009–2011); Donny Boaz (2019–2021); Justin Gaston (2020); Conner Floyd (2021–2025); (and child actors)
- Duration: 1988–2001; 2009–2011; 2019–2025
- First appearance: March 15, 1988
- Last appearance: July 28, 2025
- Created by: William J. Bell
- Introduced by: Edward J. Scott (1988); Maria Arena Bell and Paul Rauch (2009); Anthony Morina and Josh Griffith (2019)
- Donny Boaz as Chance Chancellor
In-universe information
- Other names: Phillip Robert Chancellor IV; Phillip Chance Chancellor
- Occupation: Military Intelligence Officer; Military Policeman; Detective; U.S. Army Soldier
- Family: Chancellor
- Father: Phillip Chancellor III
- Mother: Nina Webster
- Half-brothers: Ronan Malloy
- Spouse: Abby Newman (2020–2023)
- Children: Dominic Abbott Newman Winters Chancellor (legal)
- Grandfathers: Phillip Chancellor II
- Grandmothers: Jill Abbott; Florence Webster
- Uncles: Billy Abbott
- First cousins: Delia Abbott; Johnny Abbott; Katie Newman

Chance Chancellor is a fictional character from The Young and the Restless, an American soap opera on the CBS network. Introduced as the son of Nina Webster and Phillip Chancellor III, he was portrayed by various child actors from 1988 to 2001. From 2009 to 2011, actor John Driscoll portrayed the role. In 2019, actor Donny Boaz was cast in the role; he exited in February 2021. Conner Floyd debuted in the role that November; he exited the role in July 2025 following Chance's death.

== Casting ==
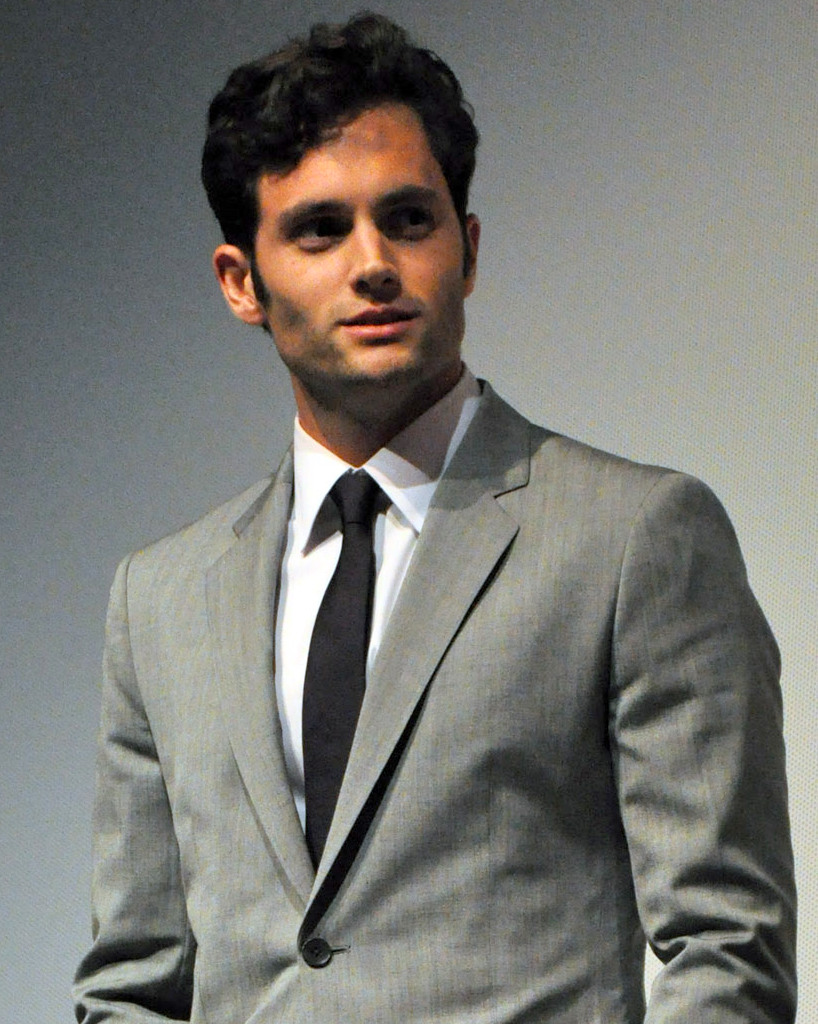
Cast in 2000, Penn Badgley was the final child actor to portray the role; he exited in 2001.

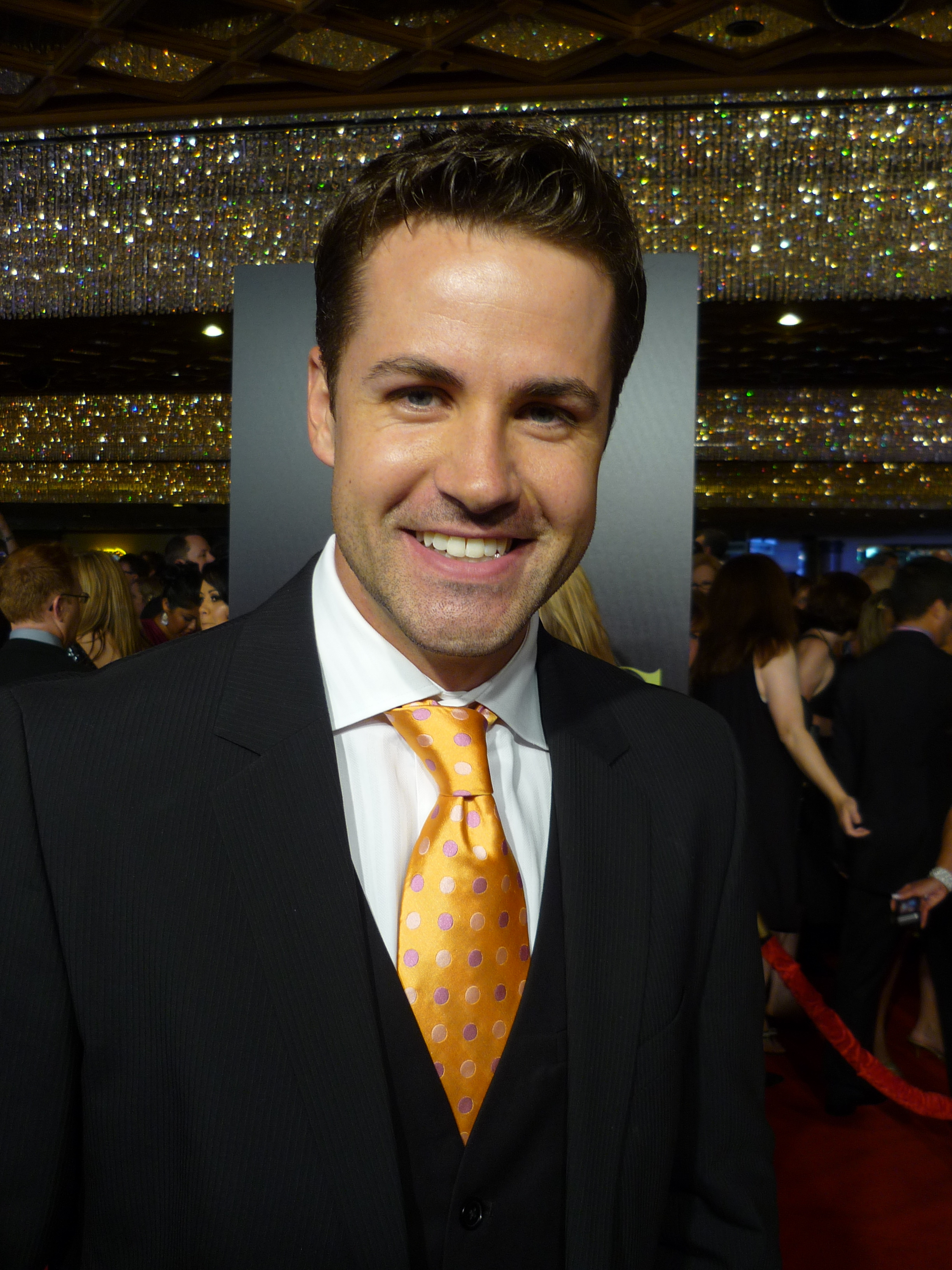
In 2009, the character returned, under the portrayal of John Driscoll; he was let go in 2010, and returned for guest appearances in 2011.

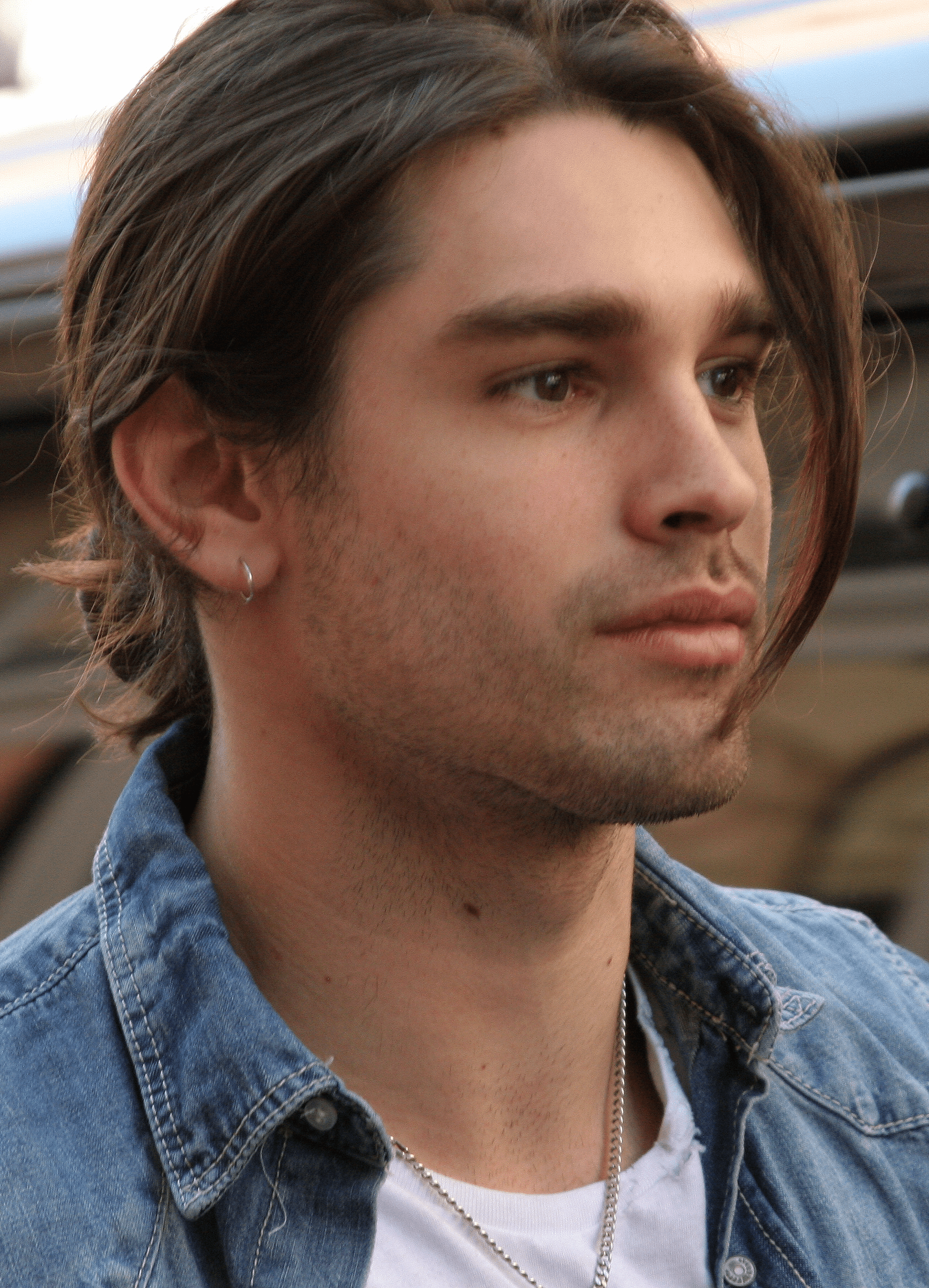
Justin Gaston was temporarily cast in the role in 2020.

The role of "Little Phillip" was first portrayed by infant twins Michael and Jonathan Hall in 1988 during all of the hospital scenes, followed by Andrew and Clark Rogers in 1988, Chuckie and Kenny Gravino from 1988 to 1989, and Scott and Shaun Markley from 1991 to 1993. Thomas Dekker briefly took over in 1993 before Courtland Mead assumed the role until 1995. He was first replaced by Alex D. Linz before Nicholas Pappone took over until 1999. The final child actor to portray the role was future Gossip Girl actor Penn Badgley, from May 12, 2000, to February 1, 2001.

In May 2009, it was announced that John Driscoll, previously known for his portrayal of Cooper Bradshaw on Guiding Light, had been cast in the role. He made his debut on July 16, 2009. In August 2010, it was announced that Driscoll had been let go and his last airdate was September 9, 2010. However, Driscoll returned for several guest appearances in 2011; from February to May, and from October 20 to November 11.

In November 2019, it was announced that Donny Boaz had been cast in the role of Chance; he will make his first appearance on November 8. In November of the following year, Boaz announced he would temporarily exit the role after being diagnosed with COVID-19; at press time, the actor announced he had already returned to set. It was subsequently announced Justin Gaston, the real-life spouse of Boaz's love interest Melissa Ordway (Abby Newman) had been temporarily cast in the role. On January 31, 2021, Boaz announced he had been let go from the role; he last appeared on February 1. In June 2025, it was revealed Floyd would vacate the role, following his casting as Chad DiMera on Days of Our Lives. He made his final appearance on July 28.

== Storylines ==
=== 1988–2001 ===
Phillip "Chance" Chancellor is the son of the wealthy heir to Chancellor Industries, Phillip Chancellor III and Nina Webster. After his father's apparent death, his mother marries Ryan McNeil, whom Phillip thinks of as a father. He is upset when Ryan leaves Nina to be with Tricia Dennison; meanwhile, Ryan is caught between the woman he loves and the boy whom he thinks of as his son. Nina eventually convinces Phillip to spend time with his stepfather and Tricia in order to get to know her. Eventually, Ryan leaves Tricia to be with Victoria Newman and Nina begins a relationship with Tomas Del Cerro. However, Ryan remains a fixture in Phillip's life until he is killed at his wedding to Victoria in 2001. Shortly afterward, Nina and Phillip move to Los Angeles.

=== 2009–2011 ===
In November 2008, Nina returns to Genoa City for the funeral of Katherine Chancellor, however it is really Katherine's lookalike, Marge Cotrooke, who has died. She reveals that Phillip is serving in the Iraq War. In 2009, she returns again, this time for Katherine's wedding to Patrick Murphy. Phillip comes home in July 2009, now going by the nickname Chance; this occurs shortly after his father is revealed to be alive. Chance struggles with accepting that his father faked his death and develops an attraction to his uncle Billy Abbott's estranged wife, Chloe Mitchell. It is apparent to everyone that Chance has a crush on Chloe, who continues to find ways to separate from Billy, and his true love, Mackenzie Browning. Chloe then tries to fix up Chance with Mackenzie as both of them became friends and to play along, although they have no romantic attraction to one another.

Later on, Chance is stabbed by a homeless man at Crimson Lights. He is rushed to Genoa City Memorial where he has emergency surgery to remove his spleen. After realizing that she might lose Chance, Chloe finally admits her true feelings for him, much to his mother's dismay. Chance's surgery is successful, and he returns home where he and Chloe continue their relationship. After the couple declare their love for one another, Chance plans a surprise trip to New York City where he proposes while stuck in traffic in a cab. Chloe says no, and the two return home to Genoa City. Chance agrees to make love and to lose his virginity to Chloe. After talking with Kevin Fisher, Chloe asks Chance to marry her. Later after responding to a bomb call from ADA Heather Stevens, Chance happily accepts Chloe's proposal. Chance has sex with Heather and is afraid to tell Chloe of their affair. Chance told Chloe he cheated with Heather; Chloe is very hurt and angry. She later confronts and physically attacks Heather. Ronan Malloy pulls Chloe off Heather and in the hall tells her he understands her pain. Chance and Ronan, who had gone to meet Chloe at Jimmy's the day Heather was attacked, get into a nasty fight. Christine Blair, Nina's longtime best friend, breaks it up, but Chance tells Ronan that it isn't over. Ronan, due to his intense hatred of Chance, makes it clear to Christine after the fight that he and Chance are not and never will be brothers despite the fact that they have the same mother.

A few days later, Chance is arraigned and confesses that he is holding the heroin, much to everyone's shock, and is sent to jail as a result. In truth, he made the confession only so that he could ascertain who was dealing drugs to the inmates. Chance is accidentally shot dead by Ronan. Nina, Paul, Chloe, and Heather rush in just as he is shot. Paramedics pronounce him dead on the spot. Nina and Phillip III are driven to a country road out of town to meet with Christine and Ronan, and in the backseat of Ronan and Christine's car appeared Chance, who said that "only those four must know that he is still alive" as he is going into the witness protection program and that this may be the last time he ever sees his mother. After Chance enters the Witness Protection Program, Katherine finds out through Nina that he is alive. Due to Ronan suffering from a liver condition that may require a partial transplant, Chance may be forced to leave the program to help him if it is determined that he is a match for his brother, whose birth father died from the same illness.

Christine, Nina, Ronan, Phillip, Katherine, Paul, and Heather also know the truth about Chance's "death", and later Jill finds out as well. Christine tells Ronan, Paul, and Heather at the hospital that Chance is indeed a match for Ronan's partial liver transplant. The procedure is completed, but afterwards Ronan disappears. Christine later traces Ronan and it appears that Ronan came to Genoa City only to find his family and a match for a liver donation.

After reconnecting as a friend with Chloe and a failed romance attempt with Heather, Chance decides to return to the army, much to Nina's anger. She blames Heather for this, which leads Paul to defend Heather. Chance's decision also angers Jill and Katherine, but it appears that the deal is already finalized. On Memorial Day, Chance leaves after his going-away party at the Chancellor Estate where he defends Heather against Nina and is also greeted by his father again. He also has a warm exchange with Chloe. Chance is revealed to be secretly working with Ronan to take down Colin Atkinson. He later reveals that he will be leaving Genoa City again, as he has been offered a job at the Pentagon.
