= Arnold Dresden =

Dutch-American mathematician

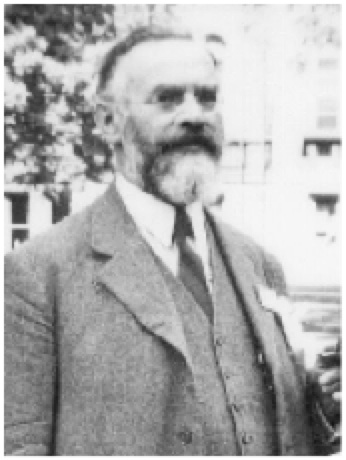
Prof. Arnold Dresden at Swarthmore College

Arnold Dresden (1882–1954) was a Dutch-American mathematician, known for his work in the calculus of variations and collegiate mathematics education. He was a president of the Mathematical Association of America and a member of the American Philosophical Society.

== Background ==
Dresden was born in Amsterdam on November 23, 1882, into a wealthy banking family. After matriculating for three years at the University of Amsterdam he used tuition money in 1903 to book passage on a ship to New York City. He then traveled to Chicago to help a friend, arriving there on his 21st birthday. Two years later, after saving money from working at various jobs, he enrolled in the graduate program at the University of Chicago, where he earned his Ph.D. in 1909 under the direction of Oskar Bolza with thesis The Second Derivatives of the Extremal Integral.

== Research and teaching ==
Dresden taught at the University of Wisconsin 1909–1927. During this time he wrote several papers on the calculus of variations and systems of linear differential equations. He directed one doctoral dissertation. He was elected a Fellow of the American Association for the Advancement of Science in 1911. He was recruited to Swarthmore College by President Frank Aydelotte to initiate an honors program in mathematics that ended up being a model for other colleges and universities throughout the U.S. Dresden remained at the elite Quaker college until retiring in 1952; he was adored by many of his students. He was a Guggenheim Fellow for the academic years 1930–1931 and 1934–1935. In 1935–1936 he was on sabbatical at the Institute for Advanced Study, where he wrote An Invitation to Mathematics. He died on April 10, 1954, in Swarthmore, Pennsylvania, at age 71.

While at Wisconsin Arnold Dresden was active in and served as secretary of, the Chicago Section of the American Mathematical Society. A charter member of the Mathematical Association of America, he was elected President for 1933–1934. He also served as Vice-President during 1931 and as a member of the Board of Governors for 1935–1940 and 1943–1945. His retiring presidential address, “A program for mathematics", encapsulated his deep concern about the place of mathematics in general culture and about the mathematical community's laissez-faire attitude toward the role it should play. A recurring theme was his belief that abstract concepts can be grasped by young people, which he preached in his 1936 book, An Invitation to Mathematics. He was also known as an ally to women in the field, as well. He also wrote three textbooks and translated van der Waerden’s classic Science Awakening from Dutch into English.

== Articles ==
- Dresden, Arnold (1908). "The second derivatives of the extremal-integral". Trans. Amer. Math. Soc. 9 (4): 467–486. doi:10.1090/s0002-9947-1908-1500822-8. MR 1500822.
- Dresden, Arnold (1916). "On the second derivatives of an extremal-integral with an application to a problem with variable end points". Trans. Amer. Math. Soc. 17 (4): 425–436. doi:10.1090/s0002-9947-1916-1501051-9. MR 1501051.
- Dresden, Arnold (1924). "Brouwer's contributions to the foundations of mathematics". Bull. Amer. Math. Soc. 30 (1–2): 31–40. doi:10.1090/s0002-9904-1924-03844-0. MR 1560837.
- Dresden, Arnold (1926). "Some recent work in the calculus of variations". Bull. Amer. Math. Soc. 32 (5): 475–521. doi:10.1090/s0002-9904-1926-04248-8. MR 1561253.
- Dresden, Arnold (1928). "Some philosophical aspects of mathematics". Bull. Amer. Math. Soc. 34 (4): 438–452. doi:10.1090/s0002-9904-1928-04560-3. MR 1561587.
- Dresden, Arnold (1933). "On the generalized Vandermonde determinant and symmetric functions". Bull. Amer. Math. Soc. 39 (6): 443–449. doi:10.1090/s0002-9904-1933-05664-1. MR 1562644.
- Dresden, Arnold (1942). "On the iteration of linear homogeneous transformations". Bull. Amer. Math. Soc. 48 (8): 577–579. doi:10.1090/s0002-9904-1942-07736-6. MR 0006984.

== Books ==
- Dresden, Arnold (1921). Plane trigonometry. John Wiley.
- Dresden, Arnold (1964) [1930]. Solid Analytical Geometry and Determinants. NY and London (1930): John Wiley and Chapman & Hall; (reprint) Dover.
- Dresden, Arnold (1936). An Invitation to Mathematics. H. Holt.
- Dresden, Arnold (1940). Introduction to the Calculus. H. Holt.
- Waerden, B. L., van der; English trans. Arnold Dresden (1954). Science Awakening. Noordhoff.
