= Lloyd Dines =

American-Canadian mathematician

Lloyd Lyne Dines (29 March 1885, in Shelbyville, Missouri – 17 January 1964, in Quincy, Illinois) was an American-Canadian mathematician, known for his pioneering work on linear inequalities.

== Education and career ==
Dines received B.A. in 1906 and M.A. in 1907 from Northwestern University and Ph.D. in 1911 from the University of Chicago under Gilbert Bliss with thesis The highest common factor of a system of polynomials in one variable, with an application to implicit functions. In 1911 he became an instructor of mathematics at Columbia University and then became an associate professor at the University of Arizona. From 1915 to 1934 he was a professor at the University of Saskatchewan. In 1928 he was elected to the Royal Society of Canada. In 1932 he was an invited speaker at the International Congress of Mathematicians in Zürich. From 1934 to 1945 he was a professor at the Carnegie Institute of Technology and chair of the mathematics department. After his retirement in 1945, Dines held visiting professorships at the University of Saskatchewan, Smith College, and Northwestern University.

== Selected publications ==
- Dines, Lloyd L. (1913). "Concerning two recent theorems on implicit functions". Bull. Amer. Math. Soc. 19 (9): 462–467. doi:10.1090/s0002-9904-1913-02397-8. MR 1559394.
- Dines, L. L. (1915). "Complete existential theory of Sheffer's postulates for Boolean algebras". Bull. Amer. Math. Soc. 21 (4): 183–188. doi:10.1090/s0002-9904-1915-02595-4. MR 1559609.
- Dines, L. L. (1919). "Projective transformations in function space". Trans. Amer. Math. Soc. 20: 45–65. doi:10.1090/s0002-9947-1919-1501115-2. MR 1501115.
- Dines, L. L. (1924). "Concerning a suggested and discarded generalization of the Weierstrass factorization theorem". Bull. Amer. Math. Soc. 30 (5–6): 233–236. doi:10.1090/s0002-9904-1924-03889-0. MR 1560882.
- Dines, Lloyd L. (1924). "A theorem on the factorization of polynomials of a certain type". Trans. Amer. Math. Soc. 26: 17–24. doi:10.1090/s0002-9947-1924-1501262-7. MR 1501262.
- Dines, L. L. (1927). "Linear inequalities in general analysis". Bull. Amer. Math. Soc. 33 (6): 695–700. doi:10.1090/s0002-9904-1927-04461-5. MR 1561451.
- Dines, Lloyd L. (1927). "On sets of functions of a general variable". Trans. Amer. Math. Soc. 29 (2): 463–470. doi:10.1090/s0002-9947-1927-1501398-3. MR 1501398.
- Dines, L. L. (1928). "A theorem on orthogonal sequences". Trans. Amer. Math. Soc. 30 (2): 439–446. doi:10.1090/s0002-9947-1928-1501437-0. MR 1501437.
- Dines, Lloyd L. (1928). "A theorem on orthogonal functions with an application to integral inequalities". Trans. Amer. Math. Soc. 30 (2): 425–438. doi:10.1090/s0002-9947-1928-1501436-9. MR 1501436.
- Dines, L. L. (1930). "Linear inequalities and some related properties of functions". Bull. Amer. Math. Soc. 36 (6): 393–405. doi:10.1090/s0002-9904-1930-04956-3. MR 1561956.
- Dines, L. L. (1936). "Convex extension and linear inequalities". Bull. Amer. Math. Soc. 42 (6): 353–365. doi:10.1090/s0002-9904-1936-06299-3. MR 1563300. S2CID 44594799.
- with David Moskovitz: Moskovitz, David; Dines, L. L. (1940). "On the supporting-plane property of a convex body". Bull. Amer. Math. Soc. 46 (6): 482–489. doi:10.1090/s0002-9904-1940-07242-8. MR 0002008.
- Dines, Lloyd L. (1941). "On the mapping of quadratic forms". Bull. Amer. Math. Soc. 47 (6): 494–498. doi:10.1090/s0002-9904-1941-07494-x. MR 0004216.
- Dines, Lloyd L. (1942). "On the mapping of n quadratic forms". Bull. Amer. Math. Soc. 48 (6): 467–471. doi:10.1090/s0002-9904-1942-07707-x. MR 0006141.
- Dines, Lloyd L. (1943). "On linear combinations of quadratic forms". Bull. Amer. Math. Soc. 49 (6): 388–393. doi:10.1090/s0002-9904-1943-07925-6. MR 0008068.
- Dines, LL (November 1947). "On a theorem of von Neumann". Proc Natl Acad Sci U S A. 33 (11): 329–31. Bibcode:1947PNAS...33..329D. doi:10.1073/pnas.33.11.329. PMC 1079066. PMID 16588759.
