= Gilbert Ames Bliss =

American mathematician

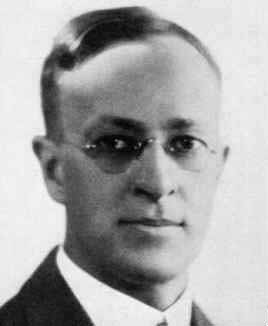
- Born: May 9, 1876; Chicago, Illinois, US
- Died: May 8, 1951 (aged 74); Harvey, Illinois, US
- Education: University of Chicago
- Known for: Calculus of variations
- Awards: Chauvenet Prize (1925)
- Scientific career
- Fields: Mathematics
- Workplaces: University of Chicago
- Doctoral advisor: Oskar Bolza
- Doctoral students: Lloyd Dines; Magnus Hestenes; A. S. Householder; Mary Landers; Gillie Larew; Edward McShane; D. M. Smith; Marion E. Stark; James H. Taylor; Marion Ballantyne White; Evelyn Prescott Wiggin
- Other notable students: Herman Goldstine

Gilbert Ames Bliss (May, 9 1876 – May 8, 1951) was an American mathematician, known for his work on the calculus of variations.

== Life ==
Bliss grew up in a Chicago family that eventually became affluent; in 1907, his father became president of the company supplying all of Chicago's electricity. The family was not affluent, however, when Bliss entered the University of Chicago in 1893 (its second year of operation). Hence he had to support himself while a student by winning a scholarship, and by playing in a student professional mandolin quartet.

After obtaining the B.Sc. in 1897, he began graduate studies at Chicago in mathematical astronomy (his first publication was in that field), switching in 1898 to mathematics. He discovered his life's work, the calculus of variations, via the lecture notes of Weierstrass's 1879 course, and Bolza's teaching. Bolza went on to supervise Bliss's Ph.D. thesis, The Geodesic Lines on the Anchor Ring, completed in 1900 and published in the Annals of Mathematics in 1902. After two years as an instructor at the University of Minnesota, Bliss spent the 1902–03 academic year at the University of Göttingen, interacting with Felix Klein, David Hilbert, Hermann Minkowski, Ernst Zermelo, Erhard Schmidt, Max Abraham, and Constantin Carathéodory.

Upon returning to the United States, Bliss taught one year each at the University of Chicago and the University of Missouri. In 1904, he published two more papers on the calculus of variations in the Transactions of the American Mathematical Society. Bliss was a Preceptor at Princeton University, 1905–08, joining a strong group of young mathematicians that included Luther P. Eisenhart, Oswald Veblen, and Robert Lee Moore. While at Princeton he was also an associate editor of the Annals of Mathematics.

In 1908, Chicago's Maschke died and Bliss was hired to replace him; Bliss remained at Chicago until his 1941 retirement. While at Chicago, he was an editor of the Transactions of the American Mathematical Society, 1908–16, and chaired the Mathematics Department, 1927–41. That Department was less distinguished under Bliss than it had been under E. H. Moore's previous leadership, and than it would become under Marshall Stone's and Saunders MacLane's direction after World War II. A near-contemporary of Bliss's at Chicago was the algebraist Leonard Dickson.

During World War I, he worked on ballistics, designing new firing tables for artillery, and lectured on navigation. In 1918, he and Oswald Veblen worked together in the Range Firing Section at the Aberdeen Proving Ground, applying the calculus of variations to correct shell trajectories for the effects of wind, changes in air density, the rotation of the Earth, and other perturbations.

Bliss married Helen Hurd in 1912, who died in the 1918 influenza pandemic; their two children survived. Bliss married Olive Hunter in 1920; they had no children.

Bliss was elected to the National Academy of Sciences (United States) in 1916. He was the American Mathematical Society's Colloquium Lecturer (1909), Vice President (1911), and President (1921–22). He received the Mathematical Association of America's first Chauvenet Prize, in 1925, for his article "Algebraic functions and their divisors," which culminated in his 1933 book Algebraic functions. He was also an elected member of the American Philosophical Society and the American Academy of Arts and Sciences.

Bliss once headed a government commission that devised rules for apportioning seats in the U.S. House of Representatives among the several states.

== Work ==
Bliss's work on the calculus of variations culminated in his classic 1946 monograph, Lectures on the Calculus of Variations, which treated the subject as an end in itself and not as an adjunct of mechanics. Here Bliss achieved a substantial simplification of the transformation theories of Clebsch and Weierstrass. Bliss also strengthened the necessary conditions of Euler, Weierstrass, Legendre, and Jacobi into sufficient conditions. Bliss set out the canonical formulation and solution of the problem of Bolza with side conditions and variable end-points. Bliss's Lectures more or less constitutes the culmination of the classic calculus of variations of Weierstrass, Hilbert, and Bolza. Subsequent work on variational problems would strike out in new directions, such as Morse theory, optimal control, and dynamic programming.

Bliss also studied singularities of real transformations in the plane.

== Publications ==
- 1925 Calculus of Variations
- 1933 Algebraic Functions
- 1944 Mathematics for Exterior Ballistics
- 1946 Lectures on the Calculus of Variations
