= Oskar Bolza =

German mathematician (1857–1942)

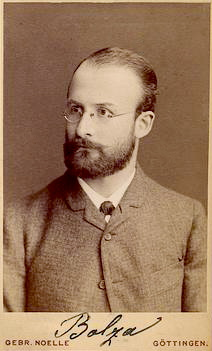
- Oskar Bolza (1857-1942)
- Born: 12 May 1857; Bad Bergzabern, Palatinate
- Died: 5 July 1942 (aged 85); Freiburg im Breisgau, Germany
- Education: University of Gottingen; University of Berlin
- Known for: The Bolza problem Bolza surface
- Scientific career
- Fields: Mathematician
- Workplaces: University of Chicago; Clark University
- Thesis: Über die Reduction hyperelliptischer Integrale erster Ordnung und erster Gattung auf elliptische, insbesondere über die Reduction durch eine Transformation vierten Grades (1886)
- Doctoral advisor: Felix Klein
- Doctoral students: Gilbert Ames Bliss; Arnold Dresden; John Irwin Hutchinson; Mary Emily Sinclair; Buz M. Walker
- Other notable students: Anne Bosworth

Oskar Bolza (12 May 1857 – 5 July 1942) was a German mathematician, and student of Felix Klein. He was born in Bad Bergzabern, Palatinate, then a district of Bavaria, known for his research in the calculus of variations, particularly influenced by Karl Weierstrass' 1879 lectures on the subject.

== Life ==
Bolza entered the University of Berlin in 1875. His first interest was in linguistics, then he studied physics with Gustav Kirchhoff and Hermann von Helmholtz, but experimental work did not attract him, so he decided on mathematics in 1878. The years 1878–1881 were spent studying under Elwin Christoffel and Theodor Reye at Strasbourg, Hermann Schwarz at Göttingen, and particularly Karl Weierstrass in Berlin.

In the spring of 1888 he landed in Hoboken, New Jersey, searching for a job in the United States: he succeeded in finding a position in 1889 at Johns Hopkins University and then at the then newly founded Clark University. In 1892 Bolza joined the University of Chicago and worked there up to 1910 when, after becoming unhappy in the United States as a consequence of the death of his friend Heinrich Maschke in 1908, he and his wife returned to Freiburg in Germany. The events of World War I greatly affected Bolza and, after 1914, he stopped his research in mathematics. He became interested in religious psychology, languages (particularly Sanskrit), and Indian religions. He published the book Glaubenlose Religion (religion without belief) in 1930 under the pseudonym F. H. Marneck. However, later in his life, he returned to do research in mathematics, lecturing at University of Freiburg from 1929 up to his retirement in 1933.

=== Academic career ===
After eight years of study and many changes of direction, he completed his doctoral studies at the Georg-August-Universität Göttingen in 1886, where he wrote his thesis under the supervision of Felix Klein.

In 1889 Bolza worked at Johns Hopkins University, where Simon Newcomb gave him a temporary short-term appointment "reader in mathematics", then he obtained a position as an associate professor at Clark University. While at Clark, Bolza published an early work on group theory in the American Journal of Mathematics: "On the theory of substitution groups and its application to algebraic equations". In 1892 Bolza joined the University of Chicago and worked there up to 1910, when he decided to return to Freiburg in Germany: he was appointed there as honorary professor, while the University Chicago awarded him the title of "non-resident professor of mathematics" which he retained for the rest of his life.

== Work ==
=== Research activity ===
Bolza published The elliptic s-functions considered as a special case of the hyperelliptic s-functions in 1900 which related to work he had been studying for his doctorate under Klein. However, he worked on the calculus of variations from 1901. Papers which appeared in the Transactions of the American Mathematical Society over the next few years were: New proof of a theorem of Osgood's in the calculus of variations (1901); Proof of the sufficiency of Jacobi's condition for a permanent sign of the second variation in the so-called isoperimetric problems (1902); Weierstrass' theorem and Kneser's theorem on transversals for the most general case of an extremum of a simple definite integral (1906); and Existence proof for a field of extremals tangent to a given curve (1907). His text Lectures on the Calculus of Variations published by the University of Chicago Press in 1904, became a classic in its field and was republished several times: the augmented German edition of the same work was considered by his former student Gilbert Ames Bliss "a classic, indispensable to every scholar in the field, and much wider in its scope than his earlier book".

Immediately after his return to Germany Bolza continued teaching and research, in particular on function theory, integral equations and the calculus of variations. Two papers of 1913 and 1914 are particularly important. The first Problem mit gemischten Bedingungen und variablen Endpunkten formulated a new type of variational problem now called "the Bolza problem of Bolza" after him and the second studied variations for an integral problem involving inequalities. This latter work was to become important in control theory. Bolza returned to Chicago for part of 1913 giving lecturers during the summer on function theory and integral equations.

=== Teaching activity ===
Bolza joined the University of Chicago in 1892. Working eighteen years between 1892 and 1910. During this time the mathematics department was outstandingly successful with thirty-nine students graduating with doctorates (nine of them students of Bolza). These included Leonard Dickson, who was the first to be awarded a Ph.D. in mathematics by the University of Chicago, Gilbert Bliss, Oswald Veblen, Robert Lee Moore, George D. Birkhoff, and Theophil Henry Hildebrandt.

In 1908 Bolza moved into Freiburg and managed to become a professor at the University of Freiburg and lectured there for years. However, his teachings were interrupted by World War I afterwards he continued lecturing at Freiburg until 1926. After three years he returned to the University of Freiburg to continue lecturing, he kept up his classes until 1933.

== Selected publications ==
- Bolza, Oskar (1886), Über die Reduction hyperelliptischer Integrale erster Ordnung und erster Gattung auf elliptische, insbesondere über die Reduction durch eine Transformation vierten Grades [On reduction of hyperelliptic integrals of first order and first kind to elliptic integrals, especially on reduction by transformation of fourth-degree], Inaugural–Dissertation zur Erlangung der Doctorwürde der hohen philosophischen Fakultät der Georg–August–Universität zu Göttingen (in German), Berlin: Gustav Schade (Otto Francke), p. 40, JFM 18.0407.01.
- Bolza, Oskar (1904), Lectures On The Calculus of Variations, Chicago: University of Chicago Press, pp. XVI, 271, JFM 35.0373.01: a corrected and improved edition was published in 1960 as Lectures On The Calculus of Variations (2nd corrected ed.), New York: Chelsea Publishing Company, 1960 [1904], pp. IX, 266, MR 0123206, Zbl 0098.07203, while unabridged unaltered reprints of the first edition appeared in 1961 as Lectures On The Calculus of Variations (reprint ed.), New York: Dover Publications, 1961 [1904], pp. XI, 271, MR 0123205, Zbl 0098.07301, and in 2005 as Lectures On The Calculus of Variations (2nd reprint ed.), Ann Arbor: Scholarly Publishing Office, University of Michigan Library, 2005 [1904], pp. XVI+271, ISBN 978-1-4181-8201-4, available from University of Michigan Digital Mathematics Library.
- Bolza, Oskar (1909), Vorlesungen über Variationsrechnung (in German), Leipzig und Berlin: B. G. Teubner Verlag, pp. IX+706+10, JFM 40.0428.01. The "revised and notably augmented German edition" of the classical work (Bolza 1904).

== See also ==
- Bolza surface

== Biographical references ==
- Bliss, G. A. (January 29, 1943), "Oskar Bolza", Science, 97 (2509): 108–109, Bibcode:1943Sci....97..108B, doi:10.1126/science.97.2509.108, MR 0007721, PMID 17758494, Zbl 0060.01414.
- Bliss, G. A. (1944), "Oskar Bolza—In memoriam", Bulletin of the American Mathematical Society, 50 (7): 478–489, doi:10.1090/s0002-9904-1944-08150-0, MR 1564626, available from Project Euclid.
- Heffter, Lothar (1943), "Oskar Bolza", Jahresbericht der Deutschen Mathematiker-Vereinigung (in German), 53: 1–13, MR 0017702, Zbl 0028.10001, available from GDZ.
- O'Connor, John J.; Robertson, Edmund F. (August 2005), "Oskar Bolza", MacTutor History of Mathematics Archive, University of St Andrews.
