= Marion Ballantyne White =

American mathematician (1871–1958)

- Born: March 28, 1871; Peoria, Illinois
- Died: January 30, 1958 (aged 86); Pasadena, California
- Education: University of Michigan; University of Wisconsin; University of Chicago
- Occupations: Mathematician, professor
- Known for: Earned math doctorate before World War II

Marion Ballantyne White (1871–1958) was an American mathematician and university professor. She was one of the few American women to earn her doctorate in mathematics before World War II.

== Biography ==
Marion White was born March 28, 1871, in Peoria, Illinois to two teachers, Jennie E. McLaren and Samuel Holmes White.

After her secondary school studies in Peoria, she attended Smith College in 1888 but left after one year to teach at a public school in Peoria. From 1890 to 1893 she studied at the University of Michigan, where she received a Bachelor of Philosophy degree in 1893. She then taught high school in Pueblo, Colorado for two years, before returning to join the faculty at Peoria High School. From 1901 to 1908 she taught at the University of Illinois, and in 1906 she earned her master's degree from the University of Wisconsin. From 1908 to 1910 she earned her doctorate in mathematics at the University of Chicago under the direction of Gilbert Ames Bliss as his third doctoral student. Her dissertation was titled: The Dependence of the Focal Point on Curvature in Space Problems of the Calculus of Variations.

She began teaching at the University of Kansas in 1910. In 1914 she relocated to Michigan State Normal College (now Eastern Michigan University) in Ypsilanti, Michigan and assumed the position of associate professor of mathematics and dean of women until 1918 when she went on to teach at Carleton College in Northfield, Minnesota. She was dean of women there from 1922 to 1924 and also served as associate professor until 1937.

After her retirement at 66 in 1937, she moved to Pasadena, California, where she spent the last two decades of her life. Marion White died there on January 30, 1958. After she died the Carleton alumni magazine said "she was an especially successful classroom teacher known... for the personal stimulus and encouragement she gave the students.".

== Selected publications ==
- 1907 The asymptotic lines on the anchor ring. Ann. of Math. 2nd ser., 8:103-117. Published version of MA thesis. Reviews: JFM 38.0662.01 (P. Zuhlke); Rev. semestr. publ. math. 16, pt. 1: 11 (W. A. Wythoff).
- 1910 The Dependence of the Focal Point on Curvature in Space Problems of the Calculus of Variations. PhD dissertation, University of Chicago, directed by Gilbert Ames Bliss. Printed version, 1912, New Era Printing Co., Lancaster, PA, reprinted from Trans. Amer. Math. Soc. 13:175-198.
- 1912 The Dependence of Focal Points upon Curvature for Problems of the Calculus of Variations in Space. Trans. Amer. Math. Soc. 13:175-198. Published version of PhD dissertation. Reviews: JFM 43.0464.02 (H. Hahn) 43:464-465; Rev. semestr. publ. math. 21, pt. 1: 7-8 (P. Mulder). Presented by J. N. Van der Vries as The Dependence of the Focal Point on Curvature in Space Problems in the Calculus of Variations to the AMS, St. Louis, MO, 2 Dec 1911; abstract: Bull. Amer. Math. Soc. 18:234 #5.

== Memberships ==
According to Judy Green, Wiggin belonged to several professional societies.

- American Mathematical Society
- Mathematical Association of America
- American Association of University Women
- Phi Beta Kappa
- Sigma Xi
