= John Driscoll (actor) =

American television and soap opera actor

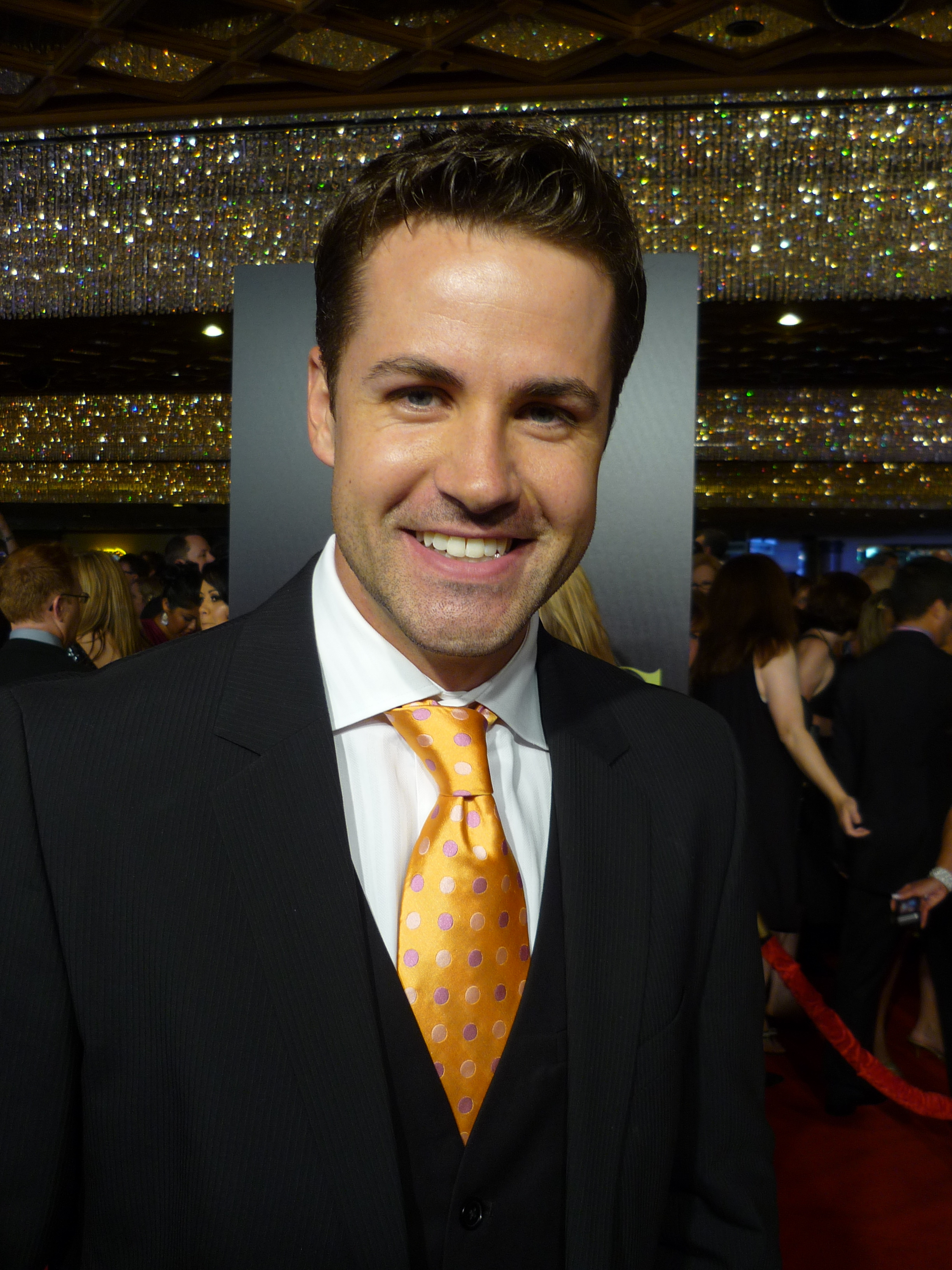
- Driscoll at the 2010 Daytime Emmy Awards
- Born: June 27, 1981 (age 44); Fort Belvoir, Virginia, USA
- Occupation(s): Actor, soldier

John Edmund Driscoll (born June 27, 1981) is an American television and soap opera actor.

== Early life ==
Driscoll was born in Fort Belvoir, Virginia. He went to Woodbridge Senior High School in Woodbridge, Virginia and graduated in 1999. He was raised in a military family that valued athletics.

Driscoll went to George Mason University where he majored in theatre and was a member of Kappa Sigma fraternity.

== Career ==
After he graduated from high school, he was a professional runway and catalog model for Armani and Versace, among others. Modeling led to acting in commercials and musical theatre.

Driscoll's first role was as Brandon on Young Americans, in 2000, in a recurring role. He also had a recurring role on Dawson's Creek (2001–2002). In 2004, he appeared on an episode of One Tree Hill. In 2006, he had a starring role on the short-lived NBC series, The Book of Daniel. He also guest starred on Law & Order: Criminal Intent that year.

Driscoll is best known, however, for his portrayal of "Coop" (Henry Cooper Bradshaw) on the daytime drama Guiding Light. He joined the show in 2004 and played his final scenes in February 2009, when the character died after injuries sustained in a car accident.

In July 2009, Driscoll made his debut as Chance Chancellor, another scion of an established soap family, on The Young and the Restless. He continued in this role until September 2010, when his character was shot and apparently killed by his half-brother, Ronan. However, it was disclosed to Nina and Philip that Chance was not dead. The character was in the Witness Protection Program. Driscoll returned for several appearances in February 2011 as Chance became a donor for half-brother Ronan's liver transplant. In May of that year his character rejoined the Army and returned to war in the Middle East on a touching Memorial Day episode, May 30, 2011.

In September 2007, he made his New York stage debut in Matt Morillo's play Angry Young Women in Low-Rise Jeans with High-Class Issues. Driscoll returned to his serial drama roots in 2020, guest starring on the podcast serial Forever and a Day.

== Military service ==
In October 2012, Driscoll followed in his father's footsteps and joined the United States Army National Guard. John Driscoll Served Overseas in Kuwait with the 29th Infantry Division in Operation Spartan shield from November 2016 to July 2017.

== See also ==
- List of Kappa Sigma members
