= Robert W. Lundeen =

American businessman

Robert West Lundeen (June 25, 1921 – April 13, 2016) was an American executive, most notable for his association with the College of Engineering at Oregon State University and Tektronix Inc. He was also known for his philanthropy towards various programs at OSU.

Lundeen was born in Astoria, Oregon. He received his bachelor's degree from Oregon State College (now Oregon State University) in 1942.

Lundeen served in China in the United States Army Air Forces in World War II, earning a Bronze Star. A weather officer, he advanced to the rank of Major.

In 1946, he joined Dow Chemical Company as a research and development engineer. By 1978, he was the executive vice president of the company. He became chairman of the board in 1982, and retired from the company in 1986. He also served on the board of Tektronix, Inc. from 1985 to 1991, acting as chairman from 1987 to 1991. Lundeen was Chief executive officer of Tektronix from 1990 to 1991.

Lundeen established several scholarships at OSU, including Robert West Lundeen Presidential Scholarship, the Betty Lundeen Achievement Scholarship, and the Robert and Betty Lundeen Marine Biology Fund. The OSU Foundation named Lundeen a lifetime trustee.

Lundeen was chairman of the board of the Monterey Institute of International Studies from 1988 to 1992 and a major donor. He established the Robert & Betty Lundeen Junior Faculty Development Fund.

He served on the advisory board for the OSU College of Engineering.
