= D. M. Smith =

American mathematician

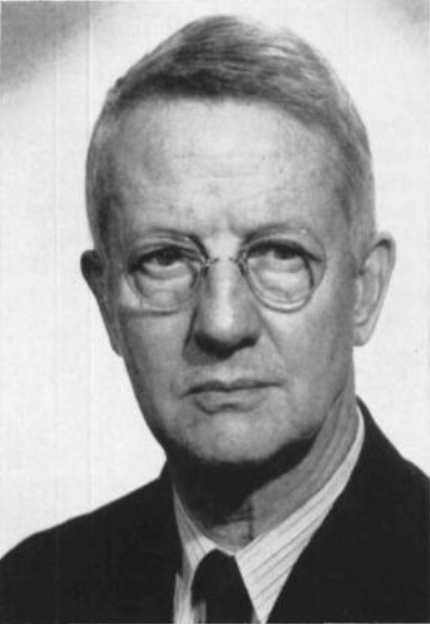
- Smith, c. 1950
- Born: July 27, 1884; Nashville, Tennessee, US
- Died: November 26, 1962 (aged 78)
- Education: Vanderbilt University; University of Chicago
- Known for: Calculus of variations
- Scientific career
- Fields: Mathematics
- Workplaces: Georgia Tech; Centenary College; Fort Worth University
- Doctoral advisor: Gilbert Ames Bliss

David Melville "Doc" Smith (July 27, 1884 – November 26, 1962) was an American professor and mathematician at the Georgia Institute of Technology (Georgia Tech). During his more than forty years at the school, he was particularly known for his teaching style and personality. Georgia Tech's D. M. Smith Building, which has housed numerous academic departments, is named in his honor.

== Biography ==
=== Career ===
D. M. Smith was born in 1884 in Nashville, Tennessee. He attended Vanderbilt University, earning a Bachelor of Arts degree in 1905 and a master's degree in 1906. Upon leaving Vanderbilt, Smith began teaching mathematics at Centenary College of Louisiana. He later moved to Texas after accepting a teaching position at Fort Worth University (now part of Oklahoma City University). Smith then returned to graduate school at the University of Chicago, where he received his Ph.D. under the advisement of Gilbert Ames Bliss. As with the most notable research of his advisor, Smith focused on the calculus of variations in his dissertation, Jacobi's Condition for the Problem of Lagrange in the Calculus of Variations. After graduating from the University of Chicago, Smith was hired by the Georgia Institute of Technology as an assistant professor.

Smith spent over forty years as a professor of mathematics at Georgia Tech. One of Smith's duties was teaching an introductory calculus course for which he received much acclaim from students. Smith was promoted in 1922 from assistant professor to associate professor. In 1936, Smith accepted a full professorship and the position of head of the Georgia Tech Mathematics department. Smith stepped down from his department head position due to his age in 1950, retiring in 1954. The Georgia Tech Alumni Association presented Smith with an Honorary Alumnus Award in 1959. Smith died of natural causes in 1962 at age 78. He was a charter member of the Mathematical Association of America.

=== Personality ===
"Doc" Smith, as he was called, made a powerful impression on his students. A Georgia Tech professor and former student of Smith's remembered him as "a friendly, inspiring curmudgeon who could scare the hell out of you, teach you, advise you, and follow your future after graduation. [...] Dr. Smith was unfailingly interested and supportive." Other Georgia Tech alumni who were instructed by Smith called him "a gifted teacher", unforgettable, likable, and "a good-hearted guy." His memorable teaching style and devotion to his students earned him the title of "legend" among alumni.

Physically, Smith was described as "a small, white-haired gentleman with a noticeable limp caused by a short leg" who "always wore a black suit with a bow tie." He was often seen driving around the Georgia Tech campus in a 1930s black coupé automobile similar to the Ramblin' Wreck.

== D. M. Smith Building ==
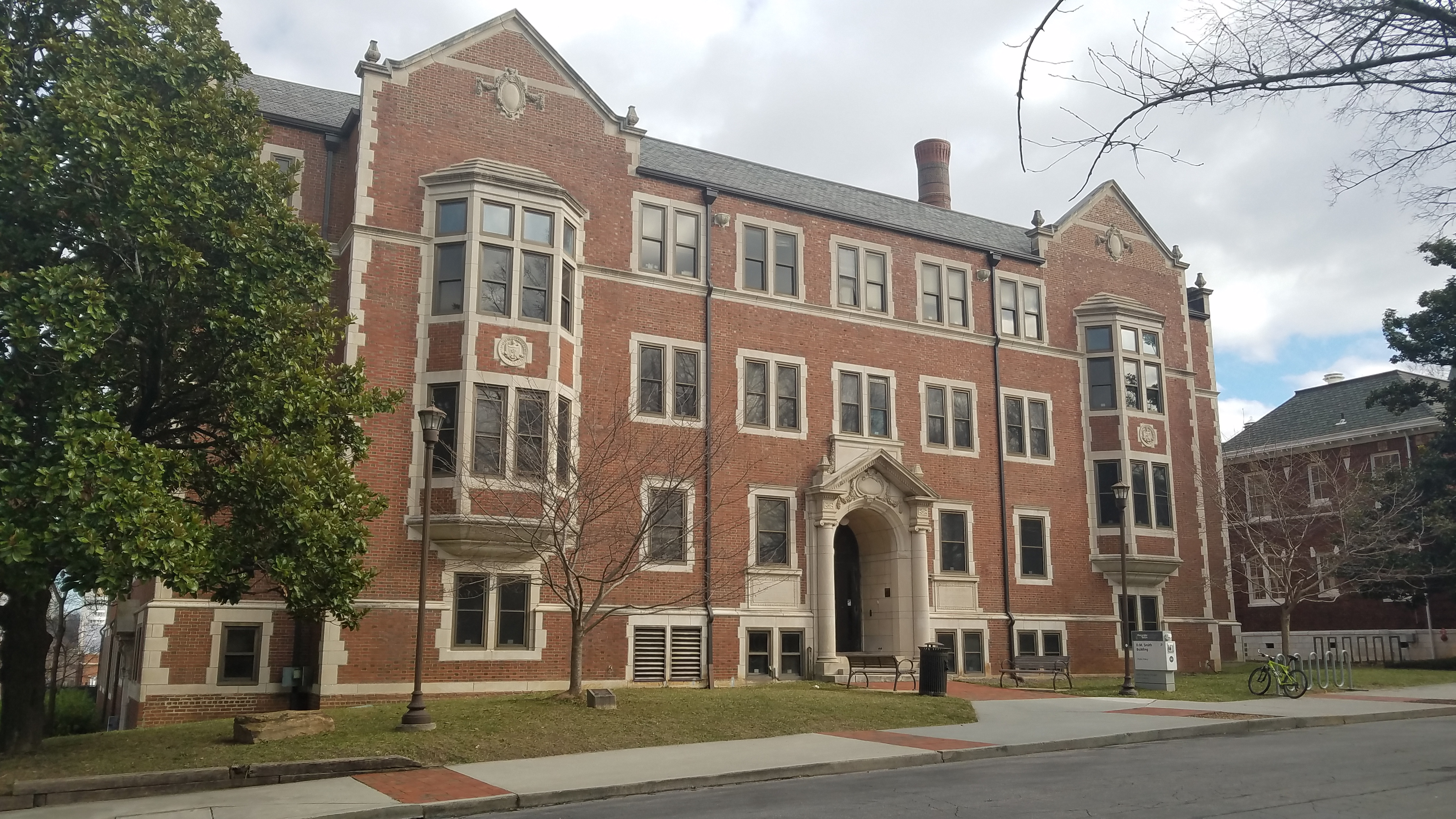
The D. M. Smith Building at Georgia Tech

Smith is recognized by the D. M. Smith Building named in his honor, one of twelve structures comprising the Georgia Institute of Technology Historic District. The building was erected in 1923 by the architectural firm L.W. Robert and Company, Inc. with US$150,000 donated by the Carnegie Corporation and $50,000 from Greater Georgia Tech Campaign funds. The English collegiate architectural style of the building, recommended by Georgia Tech architecture faculty members John L. Skinner and Harold Bush-Brown, would serve as an influential model for Georgia Tech campus buildings constructed over the next twenty years.

Many academic departments have been housed in the D. M. Smith Building as institutional needs changed. The first occupants were Georgia Tech's Architecture and Physics departments. Later, the building contained offices and laboratories for the Social Sciences, Psychology, and Mathematics departments. Presently, the building is home to the School of Public Policy and the Pre-Law Departments in the Ivan Allen College of Liberal Arts.
