= Mary Emily Sinclair =

American mathematician

Mary Emily Sinclair (September 27, 1878 – June 3, 1955) was an American mathematician whose research concerned algebraic surfaces and the calculus of variations. She was the first woman to earn a doctorate in mathematics at the University of Chicago, and became Clark Professor of Mathematics at Oberlin College.

== Early life and education ==
Sinclair was born on September 27, 1878, in Worcester, Massachusetts; she was the fourth of five children of John Elbridge Sinclair and Marietta S. Fletcher Sinclair. Her father was a mathematics professor at the Worcester Polytechnic Institute, and also had two daughters from an earlier marriage. Her mother, originally from Worcester, taught English and modern languages at the Worcester Polytechnic Institute but stopped when her children were born. After graduating in 1896 from the Worcester Classical High School, Mary Emily Sinclair became a student at Oberlin, and as a student served as president of the Oberlin branch of the YWCA. She graduated Phi Beta Kappa in 1900 with an A.B.

While working as a teacher at a seminary in Hartford, Connecticut, Sinclair continued her studies through the University of Chicago, earning a master's degree in mathematics in 1903. After briefly teaching at Lake Erie College in 1903, she taught at the University of Nebraska from 1904 through 1907, while continuing her graduate study at the University of Chicago. She completed her Ph.D. in 1908, with the dissertation On a Compound Discontinuous Solution Connected with the Surface of Revolution of Minimum Area in the calculus of variations, supervised by Oskar Bolza. She became the first woman to earn a doctorate in mathematics at the University of Chicago, and her doctorate marked the beginning of a period in which the university gave over 50 doctorates to women through 1946, likely the most of any American university.

== Career and later life ==
Meanwhile, in 1907, Sinclair had taken a position as instructor at Oberlin College, where she would remain for the rest of her career, teaching there for 37 years. The next year, on receiving her doctorate, she was promoted to associate professor. Although unmarried, she adopted two children as infants in 1914 and 1915. Also in 1915, she became one of the founding members of the Mathematical Association of America. She was promoted to professor in 1925, and became head of the mathematics department at Oberlin in 1939. In 1941 she was named Clark Professor of Mathematics. She retired in 1944, but continued to teach mathematics to US Navy students for two more years through Berea College.

She returned to Oberlin in 1947, but was heavily injured in a carjacking incident in 1950. She moved to Belfast, Maine, in 1953, living there with her daughter-in-law, and died there on June 3, 1955.

== Sinclair's discriminant surface ==
Sinclair's 1903 master's thesis was Concerning the discriminantal surface for the quintic in the normal form: $u^5+10xu^3+5yu+z=0$. In it, she uses Tschirnhaus transformations to put quintic functions with real coefficients into the form given in the title, and uses the discriminant, a polynomial of the coefficients $x$, $y$, and $z$, to classify polynomials of this form by their numbers of real roots. Physical models of her discriminant surface were made from her design by a German company, and a stone carving based on it was created in 2003 by sculptor Helaman Ferguson.
