= Gillie Larew =

American mathematician (1882–1977)

Gillie Aldah Larew (July 28, 1882 – January 2, 1977) was an American mathematician, the first alumna of Randolph–Macon Woman's College (R-MWC) to become a full professor there, and eventually the dean of the college.

== Early life and education ==
Larew was the daughter of farmer and lawyer Captain I.H. Larew, and was born on July 28, 1882, in Pulaski County, Virginia. Her father had eleven children, three of whom died before Larew was born and five of whom were from a second wife after Larew's mother died in 1887. She was privately schooled before attending Randolph–Macon Woman's College from 1899 to 1903.

In 1906, she began studying for a master's degree in mathematics at the University of Chicago over the summers, during breaks from her teaching position, completing the degree in 1911. From 1914 to 1916 she studied there again for a doctorate. Her dissertation concerned the calculus of variations; it was Necessary Conditions for the Problem of Mayer in the Calculus of Variations, and was supervised by Gilbert Ames Bliss. It was one of the earliest works of mathematics to call Lagrange multipliers by that name.

== Career and later life ==
In 1903, after finishing her studies at Randolph–Macon, Larew was hired as an instructor there. She became an adjunct professor in 1909. After completing her doctorate she became an associate professor. In 1921 was promoted to full professor, the first Randolph–Macon alumna to reach that position.

She took a year leave in 1929–1930 to study in Germany at the Ludwig-Maximilians-Universität München with Constantin Carathéodory. She also studied at the University of St Andrews in Scotland. She became head of the mathematics department at R-MWC in 1936, the first graduate of the college to serve in that particular role. In 1949, she became dean of the college, and she served as dean until her retirement in 1953.

During her long career, Larew was a member of various professional organizations, including the American Association of University Women, the American Mathematical Society, the American Association for the Advancement of Science, and the Virginia Academy of Science. She died on January 2, 1977, in Lynchburg, Virginia.

== Legacy ==
In 1948, the Randolph–Macon alumnae association endowed a professorship at Randolph–Macon, the Gillie A. Larew chair of mathematics, to honor "Randolph–Macon's most valuable alumna". The annual Gillie A. Larew Distinguished Teaching Award was established in 1968 by Fred R. & Virginia Elizabeth (Jordan) Wilson; it is the oldest of Randolph College's faculty awards. Like Larew, Virginia Wilson was also from Pulaski County and a graduate of R-MWC (Class of 1916).

A portrait of Larew by painter Winslow Williams, commissioned in 1986 by the alumnae of Randolph-Macon Woman's College, is part of the permanent collection of the Maier Museum of Art at Randolph College.
