= Paul V. Hester =

US Air Force general

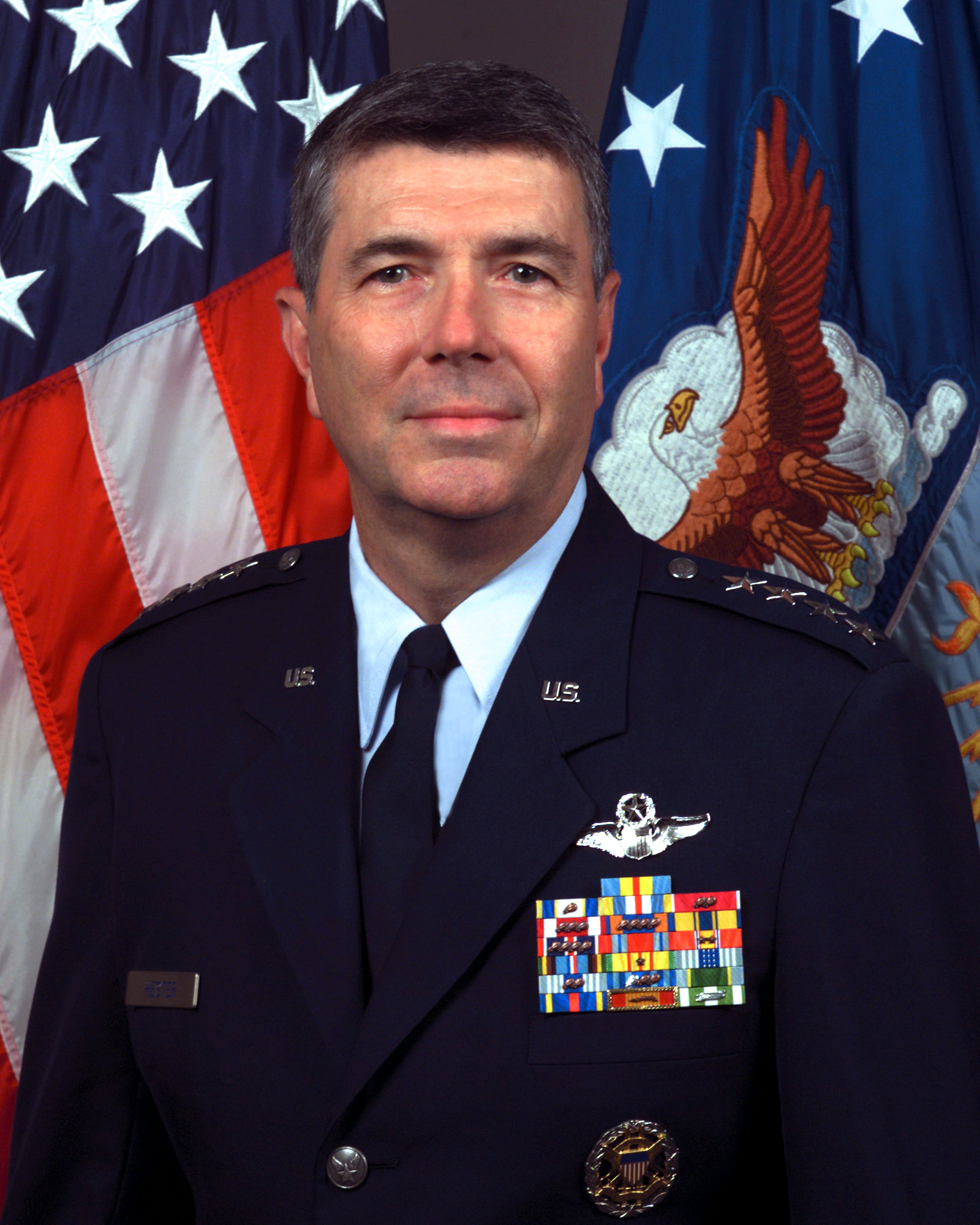
- General Paul V. Hester
- Born: 21 October 1947 (age 78); West Point, Mississippi
- Military career
- Allegiance: United States
- Branch: United States Air Force
- Service years: 1970–2007
- Rank: General
- Commands: Pacific Air Forces; Air Force Special Operations Command; United States Forces Japan; Fifth Air Force; 53rd Wing; 35th Fighter Wing; 18th Operations Group; 94th Tactical Fighter Squadron
- Conflicts: Vietnam War
- Awards: Defense Distinguished Service Medal; Air Force Distinguished Service Medal (3); Defense Superior Service Medal; Legion of Merit (3)

Paul V. Hester (born 21 October 1947) is a retired United States Air Force (USAF) general. He served as Commander, Pacific Air Forces, and Air Component Commander for the Commander, United States Pacific Command from July 2004 to November 2007. He had responsibility for USAF activities spread over half the globe in a command that supports 55,500 Air Force personnel serving in Hawaii, Alaska, Guam, Japan and South Korea.

== Military career ==
Hester was commissioned through the Reserve Officers' Training Corps program at the University of Mississippi. He earned his wings in December 1971 at Columbus Air Force Base in Mississippi. A command pilot and combat veteran, Hester has more than 200 combat hours in Southeast Asia and has accumulated more than 2,900 flight hours during his career. Additionally, he served as an instructor in the A-7 Corsair, F-4 Phantom and F-15 Eagle in operational and training units. Hester commanded the 94th Tactical Fighter Squadron, 18th Operations Group, 35th Fighter Wing, 53rd Wing and United States Forces Japan and 5th Air Force at Yokota Air Base. He also served as Commander, Air Force Special Operations Command in Hurlburt Field, Florida.

Hester's staff tours include duty in the Directorate of Plans, as a member of the Commander's Action Group at Headquarters Tactical Air Command, Chief of the Air Force's Legislative Liaison Office at the United States House of Representatives, Division Chief in J-5 of the Joint Staff, Joint Chiefs of Staff representative to the Organization for Security and Cooperation in Europe, and Director of Air Force Legislative Liaison for the Secretary and the Chief of Staff of the Air Force. He also served as the Air Component Commander and force provider to Joint Task Force-536 during Operation Unified Assistance in support of the South Asia tsunami relief effort.

== Education ==
- 1969 Bachelor of Business Administration degree in accountancy, University of Mississippi
- 1970 Master of Business Administration degree in accountancy, University of Mississippi
- 1974 Squadron Officer School
- 1979 Air Command and Staff College
- 1980 Master's degree in military arts and science, U.S. Army Command and General Staff College, Fort Leavenworth, Kansas
- 1990 National War College, Fort Lesley J. McNair, Washington, D.C.
- 1992 Program for Senior Officials in National Security, John F. Kennedy School of Government, Harvard University, Cambridge, Massachusetts
- 1993 Senior Defense Fellow, Center for International Affairs, Harvard University, Cambridge, Massachusetts
- 1999 Executive Program for General Officers of the Russian Federation and the United States, John F. Kennedy School of Government, Harvard University, Cambridge, Massachusetts

== Assignments ==
1. January 1971 – December 1971, student, pilot training, Columbus AFB, Mississippi
2. January 1972 – December 1972, A-7D pilot, 333rd Tactical Fighter Training Squadron, Davis-Monthan AFB, Arizona
3. January 1973 – July 1973, A-7D aircraft commander, 354th Tactical Fighter Squadron, Korat Royal Thai AFB, Thailand
4. August 1973 – August 1974, A-7D aircraft commander, 355th Tactical Fighter Wing, Davis-Monthan AFB, Arizona
5. September 1974 – December 1976, aide-de-camp and F-4 instructor, later, F-15 instructor, 311th, 555th and 461st Tactical Fighter Training Squadrons, Luke AFB, Arizona
6. January 1977 – June 1979, F-15 instructor and flight examiner, 525th Tactical Fighter Squadron, Bitburg AB, West Germany
7. July 1979 – July 1980, student, U.S. Army Command and General Staff College, Fort Leavenworth, Kansas
8. August 1980 – August 1983, action officer, Forces Division, Directorate of Plans, later, member, Commander's Action Group, Headquarters Tactical Air Command, Langley AFB, Virginia
9. September 1983 – November 1986, F-15 instructor and assistant operations officer, 27th Tactical Fighter Squadron, later, operations officer and Commander, 94th Tactical Fighter Squadron, Langley AFB, Virginia
10. December 1986 – July 1989, Chief, Legislative Liaison Office, U.S. House of Representatives, Office of the Secretary of the Air Force for Legislative Liaison, Headquarters U.S. Air Force, Washington, D.C.
11. August 1989 – June 1990, student, National War College, Fort Lesley J. McNair, Washington, D.C.
12. July 1990 – July 1992, Vice Commander, 18th Tactical Fighter Wing, later, Commander, 18th Operations Group, Kadena AB, Japan
13. August 1992 – June 1993, Senior Defense Fellow, Center for International Affairs, Harvard University, Cambridge, Massachusetts
14. July 1993 – July 1994, Chief, Weapons Technology Control Division, J-5, Joint Chiefs of Staff, Washington, D.C.
15. August 1994 – November 1995, Joint Chiefs of Staff representative to the Committee on Security and Cooperation in Europe, Vienna, Austria
16. November 1995 – February 1997, Commander, 35th Fighter Wing, Misawa AB, Japan
17. February 1997 – December 1997, Commander, 53rd Wing, Eglin AFB, Florida
18. December 1997 – August 1999, Director, Legislative Liaison, Office of the Secretary of the Air Force, the Pentagon, Washington, D.C.
19. September 1999 – November 2001, Commander, U.S. Forces Japan, and Commander, 5th Air Force, Yokota AB, Japan
20. January 2002 – July 2004, Commander, AFSOC, Hurlburt Field, Florida
21. July 2004 – November 2007, Commander, Pacific Air Forces, and Air Component Commander for the Commander, U.S. Pacific Command, Hickam AFB, Hawaii

== Awards and decorations ==
US Air Force Command Pilot Badge
Office of the Joint Chiefs of Staff Identification Badge

Defense Distinguished Service Medal
Air Force Distinguished Service Medal with two bronze oak leaf clusters
Defense Superior Service Medal
Legion of Merit with two bronze oak leaf clusters
Meritorious Service Medal with three bronze oak leaf clusters
Air Medal with four oak leaf clusters
Air Force Commendation Medal
Air Force Outstanding Unit Award with four oak leaf clusters
Combat Readiness Medal
National Defense Service Medal with two bronze service stars
Armed Forces Expeditionary Medal
Vietnam Service Medal with one service star
Air Force Overseas Short Tour Service Ribbon
Air Force Overseas Long Tour Service Ribbon with two oak leaf clusters
Air Force Longevity Service Award with silver and three bronze oak leaf clusters
Small Arms Expert Marksmanship Ribbon
Air Force Training Ribbon
Japanese Grand Cordon of the Order of the Sacred Treasure
Republic of Vietnam Gallantry Cross Unit Citation
Vietnam Campaign Medal

=== Other achievements ===
- Kappa Sigma Man of the Year – 2002
- 2004 Awarded the Order of the Sword
