= Glen Culler =

American engineer (1927–2003)

- Born: July 7, 1927; Savonburg, Kansas
- Died: May 3, 2003 (aged 75)
- Citizenship: American
- Education: University of California, Berkeley; University of California, Los Angeles (mathematics)
- Awards: National Medal of Technology; 1999; Seymour Cray Award – IEEE Computer Society; 2000
- Scientific career
- Fields: Electrical engineering, computer science
- Workplaces: University of California, Santa Barbara
- Doctoral advisor: Magnus Hestenes

Glen Jacob Culler (July 7, 1927 – May 3, 2003) was an American professor of electrical engineering and an important early innovator in the development of the Internet. Culler joined the University of California, Santa Barbara (UCSB) mathematics faculty in 1959 and helped put the campus in the forefront of what would become the field of computer science. He later served as director of the UCSB Computer Center and professor in the College of Engineering and extended his revolutionary view of the role of computers to include their use in the classroom. He left UCSB to work in industry and establish his own company, called Culler-Harrison, in 1969. Culler-Harrison became CHI Systems, and later, Culler Scientific.

One of Glen Culler's sons, David Culler, is a notable computer scientist in his own right. Another son, Marc Culler, is a distinguished pure mathematician working in low-dimensional topology. Another son, Randall Culler, is a Jin Shin Jyutsu master. His daughter, Katharyn Culler Cohen, works in small business and non-profit consulting.

== Work ==
Culler was a developer, with Burton Fried, of the Culler-Fried Online System, ("The UCSB On-Line System"), one of the first interactive computer systems in the mid-1960 era. This was the first system to make use of a storage oscilloscope as a means of presenting graphical information, and provided an innovative means of presentation and teaching of mathematical concepts. One of the first object oriented approaches to computing, the system provided a set of operators (e.g., add, subtract, display, multiply, sin, exp) on a predefined set of mathematical objects: scalars, vectors, arrays, and matrices (2-D only, up to about order 30..33).

This interpreted programming language was named MOLSF for Mathematically-Oriented Language, Single-Precision, Floating-point. The MOLSF keyboard consisted of a modified double QWERTY keyboard with the second, upper keyboard, renaming all keys to various functions (special hardware which included APL keyboard capability, two generations existed). The graphical integration was nearly seamless, but memorization of commands was nearly impossible.

The CFS has a second programming language named COL for Card-Oriented Language, somewhat like modern day text-editors. MOLSF and COL didn't communicate very well. They were vastly different languages. The Culler-Fried System ran at UCSB, UCLA, and TRW.

By December 1969, Culler's online system was chosen by ARPA to be the third node on the original ARPANET, by adding an IBM 360/75 computer using the OS/MVT operating system, from the Culler-Fried Interactive Mathematics Center at the University of California, Santa Barbara, and with the University of California, Los Angeles (UCLA), participated in the first exchange of packets of data transmitted in the nascent Internet.

Culler-Harrison is occasionally cited as one of the precursors to the founding of Floating Point Systems, Inc. and the Very Long Instruction Word (VLIW) architecture by Joseph Fisher and James Ellis.

Culler returned to UCSB as an adjunct professor from 1982 through 1984. Over 25 companies in Santa Barbara were spun out of Culler's work and the College of Engineering's Computer Research Laboratory including Culler Harris and Culler Scientific .

== Awards ==
In 2000, President of the United States Bill Clinton awarded Culler the National Medal of Technology for his "pioneering innovations in multiple branches of computing, including early efforts in digital speech processing, invention of the first on-line system for interactive graphical mathematics computing, and pioneering work on the ARPAnet."

He was also a recipient of the Seymour Cray Computer Science and Engineering Award from the Institute of Electrical and Electronics Engineers.
