= Scott Davidson (lacrosse) =

American lacrosse player

Personal information
- Nationality: American
- Born: April 9, 1982 (age 43) Guilford, Connecticut, U.S.
- Height: 5 ft 10 in (178 cm)
- Weight: 175 lb (79 kg; 12 st 7 lb)

Sport
- Position: Transition
- Shoots: Right
- NLL draft: 39th overall, 2005; Colorado Mammoth
- NLL team: Colorado Mammoth

Scott Davidson (born April 9, 1982) is a lacrosse player for the Colorado Mammoth in the National Lacrosse League.
