= Michael L. Eskew =

American businessman

Michael L. Eskew (born June 28, 1949) is an American businessman who is the former chairman and chief executive officer of UPS from 2002 to 2007. He is on the board of 3M, IBM, and Eli Lilly and Company.

Eskew received his bachelor's degree in industrial engineering from Purdue University, where he was a member of Kappa Sigma fraternity. He later attended the Advanced Management Program at the Wharton School of Business.

He began his career at UPS in 1972 as an industrial engineering manager. By 1994 he had become corporate vice president for industrial engineering, and in 1996 was made group vice president for engineering. In 1998 he was named to the UPS board, and in 1999 was made executive vice president. In 2000 he was appointed vice chairman, and in 2002 was promoted to chairman and CEO.

In 2003 he was appointed to the President's Export Council, and in 2004 he was elected chairman of the U.S.-China Business Council.

In 2004, Eskew was elected a member of the National Academy of Engineering for contributions to the development of technology to automate and integrate business processes for efficient on-time worldwide shipping of packages.
